The following is a timeline of the COVID-19 pandemic in Malta.

2020

March 
On 7 March, Malta reported its first three cases of coronavirus: an Italian family consisting of a 12-year-old girl and her parents, who arrived in Malta on 3 March from Rome after a holiday in Trentino. The girl was the first case, with the parents testing positive for the coronavirus later in the day. They had been in self-quarantine since arriving from Italy, and they were held in isolation at Mater Dei Hospital.

As of 8 March 2020, 540 tests have been carried out. This includes all those who were in contact with the infected family. Other than the family, all tested negative. Reports of other cases were dismissed as dissemination of false information. A further 10 people were tested on 9 March with one result reported positive in the evening, bringing the overall number to four cases. The man did not follow quarantine regulations for the first two days, which caused outrage among those possibly affected. His daughter was found also positive, becoming the fifth case. The fourth and fifth cases were reported as being Norwegians living in Malta.

In the morning of 11 March, the sixth case of COVID-19 was confirmed with the patient being a Maltese man coming back from Italy. That same evening, the 7th case was confirmed and the patient was a relative of his who had travelled with him to Italy.

In the morning of 12 March, the 8th and 9th cases of the COVID-19 were confirmed.

By midday of 13 March, 889 tests had been carried out in Malta and consequently three further cases of COVID-19 were announced, bringing the total to 12. All cases were imported from abroad. The 10th case was a Maltese man, 45, who returned from Münich on 6 March, the 11th case is an Italian man, 40, who returned from Paris on 6 March, and the 12th case was a Maltese woman, 30, who returned from Brussels on 9 March. Later in the day, the first recovery form the virus in Malta was reported.

As of 14 March there were 18 cases.

On 15 March, three further cases of SARS-CoV-2 were reported in Malta, bringing the total to 21. In total 1,385 tests had been carried out, split between 722 tests on people who came from abroad and showed symptoms, and 663 tests on people who did not go abroad but displayed some sort of symptoms.

On 13 and 15 March, the first and second cases recovered from the COVID-19 coronavirus in Malta. The two individuals were to remain under quarantine in view of the revelations that the virus can re-emerge within survivors.

On 16 March, Malta's COVID-19 cases have risen to 30 with nine new cases being recorded overnight, Public Health Superintendent Charmaine Gauci said on Monday.
Three of the cases were local transmission after people who came from holidays abroad infected co-workers. The three local transmissions were healthcare professionals, who contracted the virus from other healthcare workers who tested positive after returning from holiday.

The imported cases are of a 56-year-old Maltese woman who returned from the UK, a 34-year-old Maltese man who was on holiday in Barcelona with another person who had tested positive, a 15-year-old Spanish boy who was stopped at the airport with a group of friends, who are now in quarantine, a 49-year-old Italian woman who lives in Malta and whose husband returned from Rome, a 39-year-old man from the UK who lives in Malta and a 19-year-old Maltese teenager who was with the same group that returned from Dublin and who tested positive in previous days.

At noon, on 17 March, in a press briefing, the Maltese health authorities confirmed 8 further cases of the COVID-19, bringing the total to 38.

Of these last 8 cases, two were in contact with other people with coronavirus, four returned from abroad but put themselves into quarantine after their arrival to Malta, one of them work together with someone who was returning from Italy but who was not presenting symptoms, and the last one is unsure where he could get the virus because he did not travel and was not in contact with anybody with the virus. They found out that this last case was going to the gym, and he could have gotten it there.

At midday on 18 March, ten new cases were reported, including, for the first time, two patients aged over 70. All the patients are doing well.

On 19 March, only five new cases were reported.

At noon, on 20 March 11 new cases of coronavirus patients were reported. These included the case of a 61-year-old man, who was the first Maltese case of a COVID-19 patient who developed complications of the infection.

On 21 March, nine new cases were reported. These cases were an Indian national, 30, residing in Malta; unemployed, no travel history: he was in contact with a travel-related case, a Maltese woman, 49, who had contact with another person already positive with coronavirus contracted through travel. She reported symptoms on 19 March; two household members live with her, A school worker, she last worked there on 2 March. No risk of contagion for those who worked with her, a Maltese migrant to Australia who went into self-quarantine after travelling here from London also reported fever. Households members are under quarantine, a 25-year-old Maltese woman who returned from the UK to Malta. She then went into self-quarantine on her own in an apartment. Consequently, contact-tracing of those on the flight home was done. A Maltese national, 55, with no travel history and no symptomatic contacts, reported symptoms 14 March with fever and muscle pain. He worked on 13 March, a day before symptoms emerged. Contact tracing ongoing, a woman whose relative reported being ill after returning from England. She reported symptoms on 19 March. She last reported attending university on 10 March. This case was contained and controlled by the authorities, with household members also being tested. A foreign national in Malta, 41, who was not in contact with people living abroad was also amongst those reported, yet there is no clear indication of how this local transmission occurred. Contact tracing of workmates was being actioned. A Somali person who works in Malta, 44 years old, who flew to Brussels between 15 and 18 March, reported fever and chest pain. He reported to Mater Dei the day before after being in self-quarantine since he returned to Malta.

On 22 March, seventeen new cases were reported. 10 of the 17 cases were believed to be related to travel, while the other 7 were believed to be locally transmitted. Among the patients were an 18-year-old Maltese woman and a 37-year-old Maltese man, both of whom travelled to the UK; a 50-year-old Swedish man and 22-year-old Maltese man, whom both travelled to northern Italy; a Hungarian youth who is believed to have contracted the virus from his father; a 24-year-old Finnish youth who travelled to Vienna; a 51-year-old Maltese man who travelled to Morocco; a woman who travelled to Belgium, as well as a 46-year-old Maltese woman and another woman whose partner works in the tourism industry and is believed to have transmitted the virus to her. Among the seven other cases are a 27-year-old Maltese healthcare worker. There is also a 74-year-old man, a 60-year-old Maltese woman, a 42-year-old Indian individual and a 28-year-old Somali man. A number of patients have already been sent home, where they will self-quarantine for two weeks before they were to be tested again for the virus.

On 23 March, another seventeen new cases were reported.

On 24 March, three new cases were reported.

On 25 March, nineteen new cases were reported.

On 26 March, five new cases were reported.

On 27 March, five new cases were reported and a total of 4662 tests have been carried out.

On 28 March, Chris Fearne announced ten new cases in a press conference.

On 29 March, Charmaine Gauci reported two new cases were during the daily update.

On 30 March, five new cases were reported.

On 31 March, thirteen new cases were reported.

April 
On 1 April, nineteen new cases were reported, Five being transmitted from abroad.

On 2 April, seven new cases were reported. Another case was counted with the previous day already.

On 3 April, seven new cases were reported. The Health Ministry is alerted that one of the infected lives at the Har Far Open Centre for refugees.

On 4 April, eleven new cases were reported.

On 5 April, fourteen new cases and three recoveries were reported. As the most infected are African immigrants living in one single place, alarms of massive contagion has been alerted. This has prompted the government to lock down the reception centre in Ħal Far, where eight cases were found positive in an area that accommodates around 1,000 people packed together.

On 6 April, another fourteen new cases were reported. All cases are local transmission, with the majority being foreigners and some linked to previous cluster and expected spread among immigrants living in crowded conditions. One infected immigrant has supposedly fled from the police while being escorted to hospital. However, this was the result of missing understanding as the person went back to the centre where he was receiving treatment by the Red Cross. He was later transferred to Boffa Hospital in Floriana. Other immigrants at the centre were forcefully locked-in indefinitely (until coronavirus remains present) and safeguarded by the armed forces. The situation is considered more desperate as residents inside the facility have to share bathrooms. Two elderly people in a relationship were escorted to Malta from nearby offshore in a joint cooperation by the military and health authorities. They were required to stay in obligatory quarantine. The first Maltese person to die took place in the UK, and it is not counted with the national statistics of Malta. Meanwhile, amidst the Holy Week, the Archbishop played the harmonica.

On 7 April, the Minister for Health announced in an unusual early televised update that over 52 cases were found positive. Several more could be positive and over 300 people could be positive at this point. This was the highest spike of cases in Malta at the time.

On 8 April six more cases were reported. Later on during the day, in a press-conference held by the Minister for Health & Superintendent of Public Health, the first death caused by COVID-19 was announced. The victim was a 92-year-old woman from Gozo. During Dissett, a TVM programme, Health Minister Chris Fearne announced that 11 more people had recovered from COVID-19, bringing the total recoveries to 16.

In the morning, 9 April, the Health Minister announced that there are 32 cases, 11 recoveries and a second patient died due to COVID-19, a 79-year-old man.

On 10 April, thirteen new cases were reported.

On 11 April, twenty new cases were reported and a third COVID-19 patient died, the patient was an 84-year-old man admitted into Mater Dei Hospital on 10 April.

On 12 April, Minister for Health, Chris Fearne announced that another 28 patients recovered from COVID-19 in Malta, bringing the total to 44 along with 8 new cases.

On 13 April, six new cases were reported.

On 14 April, nine new cases were reported.

On 15 April, six new cases were reported.

On 16 April, thirteen new cases and thirty eight recoveries were reported. On this day, the geographical distribution of residence of cases was revealed, with the most populous Northern Harbour District being the most affected.

On 17 April, ten new cases and nine recoveries were reported.

On 18 April, four new cases and eight recoveries were reported.

On 19 April, one new case and nineteen recoveries were reported.

On 20 April, four new cases and eight recoveries were reported.

On 21 April, twelve new cases and twenty four recoveries were reported. A possibility of a second wave was mentioned.

On 22 April, one new case and fifteen recoveries were reported.

On 23 April, one new case and thirty-nine recoveries were reported. It was also reported that the reproduction rate of the virus had become below 1.

On 24 April, two new cases and nineteen recoveries were reported.

On 25 April, one new case and twenty-six recoveries were reported and a fourth patient has died due to COVID-19, a 96-year-old woman.

On 26 April, no new cases and thirty-three recoveries were reported.

On 27 April, two new cases and four recoveries were reported.

On 28 April, eight new cases and seventeen recoveries were reported.

On 29 April, five new cases and thirty-six recoveries were reported.

On 30 April, two new cases and twelve recoveries were reported.

May 
On May Day, Charmaine Gauci reported that two new cases and sixteen recoveries were reported. During the joint press conference, Robert Abela and Chris Fearne announced the relaxing of measures, mainly the re-opening of non-essential retail outlets, albeit with social distancing rules, as well as travel between Malta and Gozo. Certain hospital services that were sidelined for focus on the pandemic would resume.

On 2 May, one new case and twelve recoveries were reported.

On 3 May, nine new cases and thirteen recoveries were reported from 1,071 within the last 24 hours. Total tests was 35,012 

On 4 May, three new cases and seven recoveries were reported.

On 5 May, two new cases and four recoveries were reported, from and 1,218 swab tests. The two new cases include a fifth victim that died due to COVID-19, an 81-year-old man who died overnight.

On 6 May, two new cases and four recoveries were reported.

On 7 May, two new cases and six recoveries were reported. Total tests for the previous 24 hours were 1,022.

On 8 May, three new cases and six recoveries were reported.

On 9 May, one new case and eight recoveries were reported.

On 10 May, six new cases and six recoveries were reported.

On 11 May, seven new cases and one recovery were reported. The new cases included a 48-year-old mother who showed symptoms on 9 May and her two-year-old daughter who showed symptoms on 8 May. A cluster of three people related to the three cases identified on Sunday. Two, aged 47 and 24 are both healthcare workers who work in the same ward. The third is a 26-year-old woman who has not displayed any symptoms. A 30-year-old woman was swabbed with her partner. He did not test positive. A 41-year-old healthcare worker at Karin Grech, who was identified through random testing. She did not show any symptoms.

On 12 May, three new cases were reported.

On 13 May, two new cases and two recoveries were reported and a sixth patient has died due to COVID-19, a 53-year-old man who is a doctor.

On 14 May, fourteen new cases and seven recoveries were reported.

On 15 May, ten new cases and five recoveries were reported.

On 16 May, fourteen new cases and two recoveries were reported.

On 17 May, seven new cases and four recoveries were reported.

On 18 May, five new cases and two recoveries were reported.

On 19 May, eleven new cases and four recoveries were reported.

On 20 May, fifteen new cases and five recoveries were reported. Malta has now 113 active cases. 1670 swab tests were carried out, bringing the total of swab tests to 54866.

On 21 May, fifteen new cases and three recoveries were reported. Malta has now 125 active cases. 1358 swab tests were carried out in the past 24 hours resulting in the total of 56224 swab tests carried out since the beginning of the pandemic.

On 22 May, one new case and one recovery were reported. Malta remains at 125 active cases. 1560 swab tests were carried out, a total of 57784 since the beginning on the pandemic.

On 23 May, nine new cases and four recoveries were reported. Malta has now 130 active cases. 1727 swab tests were carried out, resulting in a total of 59511 since the beginning of the pandemic.

On 24 May, one new case and three recoveries were reported. Malta remains at 128 active cases. 1301 swab tests were carried out, a total of 60812 since the beginning of the pandemic.

On 25 May, one new case and nine recoveries were reported. Malta has now 120 active cases. 803 swab tests were carried out, a total of 61615 overall.

On 26 May, no new cases and no recoveries were reported. Malta remains at 120 active cases. 1472 swab tests were carried out, a total of 63087 overall.

On 27 May, a 7th patient has died due to COVID-19. He was a 97-year-old man who was diagnosed on 17 May and was receiving treatment at Karin Grech Hospital. He had serious underlying medical conditions. This comes exactly two weeks after the 6th coronavirus death has been reported. Later in the day in a briefing one new case and six recoveries were reported. Malta has now 114 active cases, 1247 swab tests were carried out, a total of 64334 from the beginning of the pandemic.

On 28 May, four new cases and ten recoveries were reported. Malta remains at 108 active cases. 1137 swab tests were carried out, a total of 65471 since the beginning of the pandemic.

On 29 May, no new cases and thirteen recoveries were reported and 2 patients had died due to COVID-19, a 56-year-old man and a 68-year-old man who both had various chronic conditions, bringing the total of deaths to 9. A total of 1193 swab tests were carrier out, bringing the number of total tests since the start of the pandemic to 66664.

On 30 May, two new cases and eleven recoveries were reported. Malta remains at 84 active cases. 1374 swab tests were carried out, a total of 68038 since the beginning of the pandemic.

On 31 May, no new cases and nine recoveries were reported. Malta has now 75 active cases. 987 tests were carried out in the last 24 hours, a total of 69025 since the beginning of the pandemic.

June 
On 1 June, one new case and three recoveries were reported. Malta remains at 73 active cases. 597 swab tests were carried out, a total of 69622 since the beginning of the pandemic.

On 2 June, one new case and seventeen recoveries were reported. Malta has now 57 active cases. 1071 swab tests were carried out, a total of 70693 since the beginning of the pandemic.

On 3 June, two new cases and eight recoveries were reported. Malta has now 51 active cases. 1030 swab tests were carried out, a total of 71723 since the beginning of the pandemic.

On 4 June, no new cases and fourteen recoveries were reported. Malta has now 37 active cases. 892 tests were carried out in the last 24 hours, a total of 72615 since the beginning of the pandemic.

On 5 June, three new cases and seven recoveries were reported. Malta has now 33 active cases. 977 swab tests were carried out, a total of 72992 since the beginning of the pandemic.

On 6 June, two new cases and thirteen recoveries were reported. Malta has now 22 active cases. 877 swab tests were carried out, a total of 74469 since the beginning of the pandemic.

On 7 June, two new cases were reported. Malta has now 24 active cases. 905 swab tests were carried out, a total of 75374 since the beginning of the pandemic.

On 8 June, one new case was reported. Malta has now 25 active cases. 507 swab tests were carried out, a total of 75881 since the beginning of the pandemic.

On 9 June, two new cases and one recovery were reported. Malta has now 26 active cases. 1152 swab tests were carried out, a total of 77033 since the beginning of the pandemic.

On 10 June, three new cases were reported. Malta has now 29 active cases. 851 swab tests were carried out, a total of 77884 since the beginning of the pandemic.

On 11 June, five new cases and three recoveries were reported. Malta has now 31 active cases. 904 swab tests were carried out, a total of 78788 since the beginning of the pandemic. Also, All cases reported today form part of the same cluster of thirteen cases.

On 12 June, five new cases were reported including one in the Intensive Therapy Unit of Mater Dei Hospital. Malta has now 36 active cases. 1121 swab tests were carried out, a total of 79909 since the beginning of the pandemic.

On 13 June, one new case and one recovery were reported, However the new case was isolated. All the tests carried out in relation to contact tracing of yesterday's cases were negative. Malta still remains 36 active cases. 1044 swab tests were carried out, a total of 80953 since the beginning of the pandemic.

On 14 June, three new cases and two recoveries were reported. Malta has now 37 active cases. 1310 swab tests were carried out, a total of 82263 since the beginning of the pandemic. Also, All 3 cases reported today form part of a previous cluster which is now seventeen cases.

On 15 June, one new case was reported which is sporadic. Malta has now 38 active cases. 554 swab tests were carried out, a total of 82817 since the beginning of the pandemic.

On 16 June, six new cases and five recoveries were reported. Two of the cases reported today form part of a cluster while the other four are sporadic cases. Malta has now 39 active cases. 1236 swab tests were carried out, a total of 84063 since the beginning of the pandemic.

On 17 June, six new cases and two recoveries were reported. One of the cases reported today is part of a formed cluster which has reached 19 cases while the other five are sporadic cases, four of which are symptomatic. Malta has now 43 active cases. 911 swab tests were carried out, a total of 84964 since the beginning of the pandemic.

On 18 June, one new case was reported which is sporadic and symptomatic. Malta has now 44 active cases. 860 swab tests were carried out, a total of 85824 since the beginning of the pandemic.

On 19 June, no new cases and three recoveries were reported. The 12 COVID-19 positive patients are receiving care in hospitals. 1 patient is in Mater Dei, 7 are at Saint Thomas Hospital and 4 are at Boffa Hospital. Malta remains at 41 active cases. 852 swab tests were carried out, a total of 86676 overall.

On 20 June, one new case and three recoveries were reported. The sporadic symptomatic case was presented at casualty. Malta remains at 39 active cases. 786 swab tests were carried out, a total of 87462 overall.

On 21 June, one new case was reported which is sporadic and symptomatic. Malta has now 40 active cases. 768 swab tests were carried out, a total of 88230 since the beginning of the pandemic.

On 22 June, no new cases and one recovery was reported. Out of the total recovered cases, the most recovered are male and the rest female. Malta remains at 39 active cases. 464 swab tests were carried out, a total of 88694 overall.

On 23 June, no new cases and one recovery was reported. Malta remains at 38 active cases. 927 swab tests were carried out, a total of 89621 overall.

On 24 June, no new cases and six recoveries were reported. This marks the first time that there were no new cases in three consecutive days since 7 March 2020. The eleven COVID-19 positive patients are still receiving care in hospitals, five are in St. Thomas Hospital, three are in Boffa Hospital, two are in Mater Dei Hospital and the other one is in Karin Grech Hospital. Malta remains at 32 active cases. 923 swab tests were carried out, a total of 90544 overall.

On 25 June, three new sporadic cases and three recoveries were reported. Two of the new cases are asymptomatic while the other one is symptomatic. Malta still remains at 32 active cases. 1027 swab tests were carried out, a total of 91571 overall.

On 26 June, two new cases (one asymptomatic while the other one is symptomatic) and five recoveries were reported. Malta remains at 29 active cases. 946 swab tests were carried out, a total of 92517 overall.

On 27 June, no new cases and three recoveries were reported. The seven COVID-19 positive patients are still receiving care in hospitals, three are in Boffa Hospital, two are in St. Thomas Hospital, one in Mater Dei Hospital and one is in Karin Grech Hospital. Malta remains at 26 active cases. 870 swab tests were carried out, a total of 93387 overall.

On 28 June, no new cases and one recovery was reported. Malta remains at 25 active cases. 661 swab tests were carried out, a total of 94048 overall.

On 29 June, no new cases and three recoveries were reported. Malta remains at 22 active cases. 516 swab tests were carried out, a total of 94564 overall.

On 30 June, no new cases and one recovery was reported. This marks the first time that there were no new cases in four consecutive days since 7 March 2020. Malta remains at 21 active cases. 567 swab tests were carried out, a total of 95131 overall.

July 

On 1 July, one new case which is sporadic and symptomatic and seven recoveries were reported. Malta has now 15 active cases. 1135 swab tests were carried out, a total of 96266 since the beginning of the pandemic.

On 2 July, no new cases and two recoveries were reported. Malta remains at 13 active cases. 892 swab tests were carried out, a total of 97158 overall.

On 3 July, one new case which is an imported sporadic and symptomatic case and one recovery were reported. Malta remains at 13 active cases. 981 swab tests were carried out, a total of 98139 since the beginning of the pandemic.

On 4 July, no new cases and one recovery was reported. For the first time since March, There aren't any COVID-19 patients receiving care in Mater Dei Hospital. However, four patients are in Boffa Hospital, one in St. Thomas Hospital and the other one is in Karin Grech Hospital. Malta remains at 12 active cases. 987 swab tests were carried out, a total of 99126 overall.

On 5 July, no new cases and one recovery was reported. Malta remains at 11 active cases. 771 swab tests were carried out with an extra 2040 swab tests added to reflect the total amount of tests carried out before March, a total of 101937 overall.

On 6 July, no new cases were reported. Malta still remains at 11 active cases. 457 swab tests were carried out, a total of 102394 overall. 42228 also used the COVID-19 symptoms checker.

On 7 July, one new case which is an imported case and one recovery were reported. The new case was imported through a repatriated foreigner living in Malta. Malta remains at 11 active cases. 930 swab tests were carried out, a total of 103324 since the beginning of the pandemic.

On 8 July, no new cases and one recovery was reported. The three COVID-19 positive patients are still receiving care in hospitals, two patients are in St. Thomas Hospital, one in Boffa Hospital. Malta remains at 10 active cases. 775 swab tests were carried out, a total of 104099 overall.

On 9 July, one new local, sporadic and asymptomatic case and two recoveries were reported. Malta remains at 9 active cases. 809 swab tests were carried out, a total of 104908 overall.

On 10 July, no new cases and two recoveries were reported. Malta remains at 7 active cases. 775 swab tests were carried out, a total of 105683 overall.

On 11 July, no new cases were reported. Malta still remains at 7 active cases. 742 swab tests were carried out, a total of 106425 overall.

On 12 July, no new cases and two recoveries were reported. Malta remains at 5 active cases. 741 swab tests were carried out, a total of 107116 overall.

On 13 July, no new cases were reported. Malta still remains at 5 active cases. 456 swab tests were carried out, a total of 107622 overall.

On 14 July, no new cases were reported. Malta still remains at 5 active cases. 931 swab tests were carried out, a total of 108553 overall.

On 15 July, no new cases and one recovery was reported. This marks the first time that there were no new cases in six consecutive days since 7 March 2020. Malta remains at 4 active cases. 985 swab tests were carried out, a total of 109538 overall.

On 16 July, no new cases were reported. This marks the first time that there were no new cases in a week since 7 March 2020. Malta still remains at 4 active cases. 1087 swab tests were carried out, a total of 110625 overall.

On 17 July, no new cases and one recovery was reported. Malta remains at 3 active cases. 930 swab tests were carried out, a total of 111555 overall.

On 18 July, one new imported case was reported. The person affected experienced symptoms days after returning to Malta from abroad. Contact tracing is underway. Malta remains at 4 active cases. 848 swab tests were carried out, a total of 112403 since the beginning of the pandemic.

On 19 July, one new case was reported. Contact tracing is now being carried out. Malta remains at 5 active cases. 834 swab tests were carried out, a total of 113237 since the beginning of the pandemic.

On 20 July, one new case which is a close contact of a previous case and two recoveries were reported. Malta has now 4 active cases. 583 swab tests were carried out, a total of 113820 since the beginning of the pandemic.

On 21 July, no new cases were reported. Malta still remains at 4 active cases. 959 swab tests were carried out, a total of 114779 overall.

On 22 July, two new sporadic cases (one symptomatic and the other asymptomatic) and one recovery were reported. Malta remains at 5 active cases. 1016 swab tests were carried out, a total of 115795 since the beginning of the pandemic.

On 23 July, one new local, sporadic and symptomatic case was reported. Malta remains at 6 active cases. 1114 swab tests were carried out, a total of 116909 since the beginning of the pandemic.

On 24 July, six new cases were reported. They form part of a cluster related to yesterday's case. 4 tests resulted positive that morning. Malta remains at 12 active cases. 931 swab tests were carried out, a total of 117840 since the beginning of the pandemic.

On 25 July, no new cases were reported. Malta still remains at 12 active cases. 1085 swab tests were carried out, a total of 118925 overall.

On 26 July, fourteen new cases were reported. Malta remains at 26 active cases. 1220 swab tests were carried out, a total of 120145 since the beginning of the pandemic.

On 27 July, one new case was reported which forms part of the same cluster of cases. Malta remains at 27 active cases. 850 swab tests were carried out, a total of 120995 since the beginning of the pandemic.

On 28 July, seven new symptomatic cases (including two imported) were reported. They form part of a cluster related to Friday's case. Malta remains at 34 active cases. 1353 swab tests were carried out, a total of 122348 since the beginning of the pandemic.

On 29 July, twelve new sporadic cases were reported. Two of them form part of a cluster related to Friday's case and the other five cases were related to The feast of St. Venera. Also 66 positive cases form part of the disembarked migrants in Malta the previous day. Malta has 112 active cases according to disputed  official figures. 1615 swab tests were carried out, a total of 123963 since the beginning of the pandemic.

On 30 July, nine new cases were reported, Most of them under 35 years of age. Four cases were related to The feast of St. Venera. Malta has now 140 active cases as well as a total of 85 cases from the disembarked migrants. 1722 swab tests were carried out, a total of 125685 since the beginning of the pandemic.

On 31 July, ten new cases were reported, Six cases were related to The feast of St. Venera while the rest are sporadic. Malta has now 150 active cases. 1314 swab tests were carried out, a total of 126999 since the beginning of the pandemic.

August 

On 1 August, Malta reported 21 new cases, the majority of which were contacts of previous positive cases, 2 cases were imported, while 3 cases are immigrants who were already quarantined. Malta has now 171 active cases. 1748 swab tests were carried out with a total number of 128747.

On 2 August, Malta reported 15 new cases and 1 recovery. 6 out of the 15 new cases form parts of different clusters, 7 were sporadic while 2 were imported. Malta has now 185 active cases. 1418 swab tests were carried out which totals to 130165 since the beginning of the pandemic.

On 3 August, Malta recorded 14 new cases. 8 cases are related to clusters and previously known cases. The rest of the cases are sporadic. Malta has now 199 active cases, 1438 swab tests were carried out resulting in 131603 total since the start of the pandemic.

On 4 August, Malta recorded 16 new cases. 5 form a part of Santa Venera cluster, 2 are part of a Paceville cluster, 5 are related to previously known cases, while the rest are sporadic. Malta has now 215 active cases, 1502 swab test were conducted, a total of 133105 since the start of the pandemic.

On 5 August, Malta recorded 36 new cases and 2 recoveries. 5 cases form a part of Paceville cluster, 4 cases are related to previously known cases, while 11 are sporadic. The authorities highlighted that 16 of the new cases are new and previously arrived migrants, 3 cases are from a recent arrival, while 13 from previously arrived migrants. Malta has now 249 active cases, 1839 tests were conducted, accounting to 134,944 since the beginning of the pandemic.

On 6 August, Malta recorded 20 new cases and 2 recoveries. 8 of the cases come from a Paceville cluster, 6 are contacts of previously known cases. 10 are sporadic. The authorities also said that 4 of the new cases are children. Malta has now 267 active cases, 1769 swab tests were carried out, total of 136713 since the start of the pandemic.

On 7 August, Malta recorded 49 new cases and 5 recoveries. Malta has now 311 active cases, 1717 swab tests were carried out, total of 138430 since the start of the pandemic.

On 8 August, Malta recorded 40 new cases. 6 cases are linked to a language school cluster, 4 linked to the Paceville cluster, 7 linked to a Confirmation party, 4 through family contact. 2 of the cases were imported. The other 17 were sporadic. Malta has 351 active cases. 1548 swab tests were carried out, bringing tests up to 139,979 since the start of the pandemic.

On 9 August, Malta recorded 54 new cases and 9 recoveries. 3 cases are tracing back to language schools, 12 linked to the Paceville cluster and 9 family members of previously known cases. The eldest case was a 75-year-old person and the youngest case is a 1 year old baby. Malta has 396 active cases. 1789 swab tests were carried out, bringing tests up to 141,767 since the start of the pandemic.

On 10 August, Malta recorded 23 new cases and 4 recoveries. 1 imported case, 2 linked to the Paceville cluster and the rest are being contacted by the contact tracing team. Malta has 415 active cases. 1618 swab tests were carried out, bringing tests up to 143,385 since the start of the pandemic.

On 11 August, Malta recorded 29 new cases and 4 recoveries. 3 cases from Mount Carmel Hospital, 2 linked to the Paceville cluster, 5 family members, 1 is linked to a previously known case at work and the rest are being contacted by the contact tracing team. Malta has 440 active cases. 1882 swab tests were carried out, bringing tests up to 145,267 since the start of the pandemic.

On 12 August, Malta recorded 49 new cases and 3 recoveries. 6 cases from Mount Carmel Hospital, 4 linked to the Jurassic Park crew cluster, 3 cases from the Balzan Football Club and the rest are being contacted by the contact tracing team. Malta has 486 active cases. 2200 swab tests were carried out, bringing tests up to 147,411 since the start of the pandemic.

On 13 August, Malta recorded 55 new cases and 13 new recoveries. 5 of the cases are family members of previously known cases, 4 cases of previously recorded cases, 2 form part of a Paceville cluster and 1 forms part of language school cluster. Rest are sporadic, contact tracing in ongoing. Malta conducted 2485 swab tests resulting in total of 149,952 since the start of the pandemic.

On 14 August, Malta recorded 31 new cases and 54 new recoveries. Malta conducted 2135 swab tests resulting in total of 152,087 since the start of the pandemic.

On 15 August, Malta recorded 72 new cases and 20 new recoveries. Malta conducted 2435 swab tests resulting in total of 154,522 since the start of the pandemic.

On 16 August, Malta recorded 63 new cases and 11 new recoveries. These cases included 10 linked to the Paceville cluster, 7 family members of previous reported cases, 9 in direct contact with active cases, 6 colleagues of previous reported cases and 4 imported cases. From now on, as per ECDC direction, the figures for cases and recoveries do not include migrants who disembarked in Malta and were placed in quarantine upon arrival. Malta has now 609 active cases. Malta conducted 2142 swab tests resulting in total of 156,664 since the start of the pandemic.

On 17 August, Malta recorded 69 new cases and 10 new recoveries. These cases include 17 family members of previous reported cases, 12 direct contacts of known cases, 7 of the colleagues cluster, 5 of the Mount Carmel Hospital cluster, 2 linked to the Paceville cluster, 2 imported cases and 2 cases related to the football and water-polo teams. All migrants arriving by boat have been placed in quarantine after disembarkation. Among these there have been 105 cases and 44 recovered. Malta has now 668 active cases. Malta conducted 2269 swab tests resulting in total of 158,933 since the start of the pandemic. Malta's nightclubs, discos, boat parties and bars will be closed from Wednesday, Health Minister Chris Fearne has announced.  A 15-person limit was also introduced. The government also introduced an amber-list which will include countries that will be considered as potentially high-risk for travel and Masks are Now Mandatory In All Closed Public Places In Malta. This was applied in the 3rd week of August.

On 18 August, Malta recorded 48 new cases and 7 new recoveries. There were 5 family members of previous known cases, 4 direct contacts of known cases, 3 colleagues of positive cases, 2 form part of the Mount Carmel cluster, 1 case related to the Paceville cluster, 2 cases related to the language school cluster and 9 clusters are related to clusters from retirement homes of the elderly. Malta has now 709 active cases. Malta conducted 2124 swab tests resulting in total of 161,057 since the start of the pandemic.

On 19 August, Malta recorded 47 new cases and 18 new recoveries. There were 6 family members of previous known cases, 3 direct contacts of previously known cases and 13 sporadic cases. Malta has now 738 active cases. Malta conducted 2261 swab tests resulting in total of 163,318 since the start of the pandemic.

On 20 August, Malta recorded 40 new cases and 18 recoveries. The day's cases included 5 cases from family members of known cases, 6 were direct contacts of known cases, 9 were colleagues of known cases, 3 form part of the Paceville cluster while 2 were imported. In the past 24 hours Malta carried out 3,030 swab tests, resulting in a total of 166,348 since the start of the pandemic.

On 21 August, in the morning it was announced that the coronavirus has claimed its 10th victim in Malta: a 72-year-old man with underlying conditions. Malta also recorded 36 new cases and 52 recoveries. In the past 24 hours Malta carried out 2,445 swab tests, resulting in a total of 168,793 since the start of the pandemic.

On 22 August, Malta recorded 31 new cases and 47 recoveries. Regarding the cases of the day before, 8 cases from family members of previously known cases, 3 were direct contacts of known cases, 2 were colleagues of known cases and 1 form part of the Paceville cluster. In the past 24 hours Malta carried out 2310 swab tests, resulting in a total of 171,103 since the start of the pandemic.

On 23 August, Malta recorded 35 new cases and 33 new recoveries. Today's cases are still being investigated. Yesterday's cases include 9 cases that were from family members of previously known cases, 3 cases were from colleagues of previously known cases, 1 case was a direct contact of a previously known case and 1 forms part of the Paceville cluster. In the past 24 hours Malta carried out 2,173 swab tests, resulting in a total of 173,276 since the start of the pandemic.

On 24 August, Malta recorded 55 new cases and 43 new recoveries. Regarding the cases of the day before, 5 cases that were from family members of previously known cases, 5 were direct contacts of known cases, 2 cases were from colleagues of previously known cases, 4 were contacts from gatherings, 1 imported case and 1 forms part of the Paceville cluster. In the past 24 hours Malta carried out 2,194 swab tests, resulting in a total of 175,470 since the start of the pandemic.

On 25 August, Malta recorded 38 new cases and 52 new recoveries. Regarding the cases of the day before, 9 cases that were from family members of previously known cases, 5 were direct contacts of known cases, 8 cases were from colleagues of previously known cases, 6 were contacts from gatherings and 2 imported cases. In the past 24 hours Malta carried out 2,048 swab tests, resulting in a total of 177,518 since the start of the pandemic.

On 26 August, Malta recorded 46 new cases and 48 new recoveries. Regarding the cases of the day before, 6 cases that were from family members of previously known cases, 2 were direct contacts of known cases, 5 cases were from colleagues of previously known cases, 2 were contacts from gatherings and 4 imported cases. In the past 24 hours Malta carried out 2,185 swab tests, resulting in a total of 179,703 since the start of the pandemic.

On 27 August, Malta recorded 37 new cases and 44 new recoveries. Today's cases are still being investigated. Yesterday's cases include 18 cases that were from family members of previously known cases, 6 were direct contacts of known cases and 6 cases were from colleagues of previously known cases. In the past 24 hours Malta carried out 2,542 swab tests, resulting in a total of 182,245 since the start of the pandemic.

On 28 August, Malta recorded 32 new cases and 65 new recoveries.  Malta conducted 2109 swab tests resulting in total of 184,354 since the start of the pandemic.

On 29 August, Malta recorded 27 new cases and 58 new recoveries. Regarding the cases of the day before, 8 cases that were from family members of previously known cases, 3 were direct contacts of known cases, 5 cases were from colleagues of previously known cases and 2 cases were from social gatherings. In the past 24 hours Malta carried out 2,290 swab tests, resulting in a total of 186,644 since the start of the pandemic. In the afternoon it was announced that an 86-year-old woman became the 11th victim of COVID-19 in Malta.

On 30 August, Malta recorded 15 new cases and 69 new recoveries. Regarding the cases of the day before, 5 cases that were from family members of previously known cases, 1 was a direct contact of a known case, 4 cases were from colleagues of positive cases and 2 cases were from social gatherings. In the past 24 hours Malta carried out 1,909 swab tests, resulting in a total of 188,553 since the start of the pandemic. On the same day, It was also revealed that an 86-year-old man died due to COVID-19, becoming the 12th victim in Malta.

On 31 August, Malta recorded 21 new cases and 87 new recoveries. Regarding the cases of the day before, 2 cases were family members of previously known cases, 2 were direct contacts of a known case, 4 cases were colleagues of positive cases and 4 are linked to social gatherings. 2,040 swab tests were conducted, a total of 190,593 since the start of the pandemic.

September 

On 1 September, Malta recorded 26 new cases and 53 new recoveries. Regarding the cases of the day before, 4 cases were family members of previously known cases, 1 case was a colleague, 14 are sporadic cases and 2 are linked to social gatherings.  1,916 swab tests were conducted, a total of 192,509 since the start of the pandemic. On the same day, a 13th victim who is an 89-year-old man died from COVID-19.

On 2 September, Malta recorded 22 new cases and 37 new recoveries. Regarding the cases of the day before, 6 cases were family members of previously known cases, 3 cases were colleagues of positive cases, 1 was a direct contact of a positive case, 1 was an imported case and 1 was a contact linked to social gatherings. 2,067 swab tests were conducted, a total of 194,576 since the start of the pandemic.

On 3 September, Malta recorded 34 new cases and 38 new recoveries. Regarding the cases of the day before, 6 cases were family members of previously known cases, 2 cases were colleagues of positive cases and 3 were a direct contact of positive cases. Malta has now 424 active cases, 2,438 swab tests were conducted, a total of 197,014 since the start of the pandemic.

On 4 September, Malta recorded 19 new cases and 37 new recoveries. 1,869 swab tests were conducted, a total of 198,883 since the start of the pandemic.

On 5 September, Malta recorded 30 new cases and 36 new recoveries. Regarding the cases of the day before, 3 cases were family members of previously known cases, 5 cases were colleagues of positive cases and 3 were direct contacts of positive cases. 1,703 swab tests were conducted, a total of 200,586 since the start of the pandemic. On the same day, a 14th victim who is an 85-year-old man died from COVID-19.

On 6 September, Malta recorded 25 new cases and 26 new recoveries  Regarding the cases of the day before, 10 cases were family members of previously known cases, 2 cases were colleagues of positive cases, 1 was linked to a social gathering and 4 were direct contacts of positive cases.  1,551 swab tests were conducted, a total of 202,137 since the start of the pandemic.

On 7 September, Malta recorded 37 new cases and 63 new recoveries. Regarding the cases of the day before, 2 cases were family members of previously known cases, 2 cases were colleagues of positive cases, 2 cases were linked to social gatherings, 2 cases were linked to a body building competition event and 3 were direct contacts of positive cases. 1,640 swab tests were conducted, a total of 203,777 since the start of the pandemic.

On 8 September, Malta recorded 23 new cases and 39 new recoveries. Regarding the cases of the day before, 3 cases were family members of previously known cases, 2 cases were colleagues of positive cases, 2 cases were linked to social gatherings, 2 cases were linked to a body building competition event and 2 were direct contacts of positive cases. 1,364 swab tests were conducted, a total of 205,151 since the start of the pandemic.

On 9 September, Malta recorded 63 new cases and 31 new recoveries. Regarding the cases of the day before, 5 cases were family members of previously known cases, 3 cases were colleagues of positive cases, 1 was a direct contact of another positive case, 1 case was imported and 7 cases were from different homes of the elderly. 2,044 swab tests were conducted, a total of 207,185 since the start of the pandemic.

On 10 September, Malta recorded 42 new cases and 43 new recoveries. Regarding the cases of the day before, 18 cases were from a cluster in a construction company, 5 cases were family members of previously known cases, 3 cases were colleagues of positive cases, 1 was a direct contact of another positive case, 2 cases were imported and 10 cases were from different homes of the elderly. 1,957 swab tests were conducted, a total of 209,142 since the start of the pandemic. On that very same day, an 80-year-old man was the 15th victim to die from COVID-19.

On 11 September, Malta recorded 43 new cases and 30 new recoveries. Malta has now 399 active cases, 2,094 swab tests were conducted, a total of 211,236 since the start of the pandemic.

On 12 September, Malta recorded 27 new cases and 17 new recoveries. Regarding the cases of the day before, 6 cases were family members of previously known cases, 3 cases were colleagues of positive cases, 1 was a direct contact of another positive case, 1 case was from Paceville and 13 cases were from a home of the elderly. Malta has now 409 active cases, 1,647 swab tests were conducted, a total of 212,883 since the start of the pandemic.

On 13 September, Malta recorded 78 new cases and 22 new recoveries. 24 cases are residents and staff from St. Joseph Home, Fgura. The rest of today's cases are still being investigated. From yesterday's cases 5 cases were family members of previously known cases, 2 cases were colleagues of positive cases, 1 was a direct contact of another positive case, 1 case was from a social gathering and 8 cases were from St. Joseph Home, Fgura. Malta has now 465 active cases, 2,407 swab tests were conducted, a total of 215,290 since the start of the pandemic.

On 14 September, Malta recorded 53 new cases and 18 new recoveries. Regarding the cases of the day before, 16 cases were family members of previously known cases, 2 cases were colleagues of positive cases, 2 were direct contacts of other positive cases, 2 cases were imported, 2 cases were linked to a body building competition event and other than the 24 cases from St. Joseph Home, Fgura reported the previous day, 2 other cases are from homes of the elderly. 499 cases remain. 1,736 swab tests were conducted, a total of 217,026 since the start of the pandemic. On that very same day, an 86-year-old woman was the 16th victim to die from COVID-19.

On 15 September, Malta recorded 49 new cases and 41 new recoveries. Regarding the cases of the day before, 14 were family members of previously known cases, 1 was a colleague, 1 was a direct contact of another positive case, 2 were imported and 3 from social gatherings with other positive cases. Malta has 507 active cases, 1,666 swab tests were conducted, a total of 218,692 since the start of the pandemic.

On 16 September, Malta recorded 106 new cases and 22 new recoveries. This was, so far, the highest spike in cases since the pandemic began. Regarding the cases of the day before, 10 were family members of previously known cases, 5 were colleagues, 2 were direct contacts of other positive cases, 3 were from The St. Joseph Home cluster and 15 were from the cluster of Casa Antonia home from the elderly. 591 active cases remain. 2,470 swab tests were conducted, a total of 221,162 since the start of the pandemic.

On 17 September, Malta recorded 35 new cases and 22 new recoveries. Regarding the previous day's cases, 20 were family members of previously identified cases, 2 were through direct contacts with active cases, 51 from the St. Joseph Home cluster, 3 from the Casa Antonia home cluster and 2 cases were imported. 2536 swab tests were conducted, a total of 223,698 since the start of the pandemic. 601 active cases remain. The total number of cases also surpassed 600 for the first time since 28 August.

On 18 September, Malta recorded 39 new cases and 18 new recoveries. Malta has now 621 active cases, 2,632 swab tests were conducted, a total of 223,330 since the start of the pandemic. On that very same day, a 91-year-old woman was the 17th victim to die from COVID-19.

On 19 September, Malta recorded 65 new cases and 21 new recoveries. Regarding the previous day's cases, 10 were family members of previously identified cases, 1 was a colleague of a previously known case, 3 were through direct contacts with active cases, 3 from the St. Joseph Home cluster, 1 from the Casa Antonia home cluster, and 1 case was through a social gathering. Malta has 663 active cases. 2922 swab tests were conducted, a total of 229,252 since the start of the pandemic. In that morning, a 71-year-old woman and an 86-year-old woman became the 18th and 19th victims of COVID-19 in Malta. Later on in the day, an 85-year-old man died, being the 20th victim of the virus on the island.

On 20 September, Malta recorded 32 new cases and 30 new recoveries. Regarding the previous day's cases, 19 were family members of previously identified cases, 4 were colleagues of previously known cases, 2 were through direct contacts with active cases, 1 from the St. Joseph Home cluster and 4 from the Casa Antonia home cluster. Malta has 664 active cases. 2196 swab tests were conducted, a total of 231,448 since the start of the pandemic. Later on in the day, an 86-year-old man died in an elderly care home, being the 21st victim of the virus on the island.

On 21 September, Malta recorded 45 new cases and 32 new recoveries. Regarding the previous day's cases, 8 were family members of previously identified cases, 4 were colleagues of previously known cases, 2 were through direct contacts with active cases, 1 from the St. Joseph Home cluster, 1 from the Casa Antonia home cluster and 2 cases were through social gatherings with other positive cases. Malta has 676 active cases. 1783 swab tests were conducted, a total of 233,231 since the start of the pandemic. In that morning, a 98-year-old man died in an elderly care home, being the 22nd victim of the virus on the island. Later on in the day, an 83-year-old man died, being the 23rd victim of the virus on the island.

On 22 September, Malta recorded 38 new cases and 34 new recoveries. Regarding the previous day's cases, 8 were family members of previously identified cases, 2 were colleagues of previously known cases, 1 was a through direct contacts with another active case, 15 from the St. Joseph Home cluster, 3 were related to the arts and entertainment industry and 2 cases were through social gatherings with other positive cases. In the evening, local news announced that an 86-year-old man died, becoming the 24th victim of the virus. Malta has 678 active cases. 2409 swab tests were conducted, a total of 235,640 since the start of the pandemic.

On 23 September, Malta recorded 42 new cases and 60 new recoveries. Regarding the previous day's cases, 11 were family members of previously identified cases, 5 were colleagues of previously known cases, 3 were through direct contacts with other active cases, 2 from the St. Joseph Home cluster, 2 from the Casa Antonia home cluster, 1 case was imported and 1 case was through a social gathering with other positive cases. Malta has 658 active cases. 2444 swab tests were conducted, a total of 238,084 since the start of the pandemic. In the morning, the local news announced that an 84-year-old man died, becoming the 25th victim of the virus.

On 24 September, Malta recorded 42 new cases and 18 new recoveries. Regarding the previous day's cases, 13 were family members of previously identified cases, 2 were colleagues of previously known cases, 3 were through direct contacts with other active cases and 2 cases were through social gatherings with other positive cases. Malta has 680 active cases. 2303 swab tests were conducted, a total of 240,387 since the start of the pandemic. In the morning, the local news announced that two elderly people, who were residents at care homes, have died after testing positive for COVID-19. They were a 91-year-old man and a 73-year-old woman who both died on Wednesday night, bringing Malta's coronavirus death toll to 27. The second victim, a 91-year-old man, tested positive on 14 September. He is believed to have been a resident at Casa Antonia in Balzan. The 74-year-old woman, who tested positive on 15 September, is understood to have been a resident at the St. Joseph Home in Fgura, which is tackling an outbreak.

On 25 September, Malta recorded 31 new cases and 70 new recoveries. Malta has 639 active cases. 2545 swab tests were conducted, a total of 242,932 since the start of the pandemic. In the morning, the local news announced that two elderly people have died after testing positive for COVID-19. They were a 78-year-old woman who died on Thursday night and a 90-year-old man who died on Friday morning, bringing Malta's coronavirus death toll to 29. The 78-year-old woman who was a patient at Mount Carmel Hospital had tested positive on 11 August. She tested negative twice on 28 August and on 9 September. She was rushed to Mater Dei Hospital on Thursday. She died at the Emergency Department on Thursday. A swab test done while she was at the Emergency Department found that the woman was once again positive for coronavirus. The 90-year-old man had tested positive on 18 September. He was admitted to the Infectious Diseases Unit at Mater Dei Hospital on the same day where he was treated. The health authorities said that the 90-year-old man had underlying health conditions.

On 26 September, Malta recorded 29 new cases and 43 new recoveries. Regarding the previous day's cases, 6 were family members of previously identified cases, 2 were through direct contacts with other active cases, 1 case was through social gatherings with other positive cases, 1 case was imported and 3 cases were from San Paolo Home for the elderly. Malta has 623 active cases. 2096 swab tests were conducted, a total of 245,028 since the start of the pandemic. In the morning, It was announced that a 94-year-old woman and a 92-year-old woman became the 30th and 31st victims to die from COVID-19. The 94-year-old woman tested positive for COVID-19 today following a routine test at an elderly home. She died shortly after. Health authorities also noted that she had tested negatives in two previous tests carried out on 9 and 14 September. The 92-year-old woman, who had underlying health conditions, was a resident of an elderly home, the Ministry of Health confirmed. She was confirmed positive for COVID-19 on 15 September, and died during the night.

On 27 September, Malta recorded 21 new cases and 54 new recoveries. Regarding the previous day's cases, 8 were family members of previously identified cases, 1 case was through social gatherings with other positive cases, 2 cases were imported and 1 case was a colleague of a previously known case. Malta has 590 active cases. 2326 swab tests were conducted, a total of 247,354 since the start of the pandemic.

On 28 September, Malta recorded 27 new cases and 41 new recoveries. Regarding the previous day's cases, 4 were family members of previously identified cases, 2 were direct contacts of other positive cases and 3 cases were from the St. Joseph Home cluster. Malta has 575 active cases. 2302 swab tests were conducted, a total of 249,656 since the start of the pandemic. In the morning, the local news announced that a 91-year-old woman died, becoming the 32nd victim of the virus. Later on in the day, an 82-year-old woman died, being the 33rd victim of the virus on the island.

On 29 September, Malta recorded 29 new cases and 85 new recoveries. Regarding the previous day's cases, 7 were family members of previously identified cases, 1 was a direct contact of another positive case, 1 case was from the St. Joseph Home cluster, 2 cases were imported, 2 cases were contacts of positive colleagues, 1 case from the Paceville cluster and 1 case was through a social gathering with other positive cases. Malta has 517 active cases. 2116 swab tests were conducted, a total of 251,772 since the start of the pandemic. In the morning, the local news announced that a 79-year-old woman died, becoming the 34th victim of the virus.

On 30 September, Malta recorded 23 new cases and 78 new recoveries. Regarding the previous day's cases, 7 were family members of previously identified cases, 2 were direct contacts of other positive cases, 1 case was from the St. Joseph Home cluster, 2 cases were imported, 1 case was a contact of a positive colleagues, 1 case from the Paceville cluster and 3 cases were through social gatherings with other positive cases. Malta has 462 active cases. 2211 swab tests were conducted, a total of 253,983 since the start of the pandemic. In the afternoon, the local news announced that an 85-year-old man died at Saint Thomas Hospital, becoming the 35th victim of the virus.

October 

On 1 October, Malta recorded 37 new cases and 43 new recoveries. Regarding the previous day's cases, 3 were family members of previously identified cases, 3 were direct contacts of other positive cases, 3 cases were from the St. Joseph Home cluster, 2 cases were imported, 1 case was a contact of a positive colleague, 1 case from the Paceville cluster and 2 cases were through social gatherings with other positive cases. Malta has 455 active cases. 2574 swab tests were conducted, a total of 256,557 since the start of the pandemic.

On 2 October, Malta recorded 44 new cases and 63 new recoveries. Malta has 433 active cases. 2252 swab tests were conducted, a total of 258,809 since the start of the pandemic. In that morning, a 90-year-old man and a 78-year-old man became the 36th and 37th victims of COVID-19 in Malta. Later on in the day, an 85-year-old man died, being the 38th victim of the virus on the island.

On 3 October, Malta recorded 65 new cases and 43 new recoveries. Regarding the previous day's cases, 10 were family members of previously identified cases, 2 were direct contacts of other positive cases, 7 cases were contacts of positive colleagues and 2 cases were imported. Malta has 455 active cases. 2108 swab tests were conducted, a total of 260,917 since the start of the pandemic. It was also announced that a 70-year-old man died, being the 39th victim of the virus on the island.

On 4 October, Malta recorded 66 new cases and 47 new recoveries. Regarding the previous day's cases, 15 were family members of previously identified cases, 5 were direct contacts of other positive cases, 13 cases were contacts of positive colleagues, 2 cases were imported and 4 cases were through social gatherings with other positive cases. Malta has 473 active cases. 2537 swab tests were conducted, a total of 263,454 since the start of the pandemic.

On 5 October, Malta recorded 57 new cases and 12 new recoveries. Regarding the previous day's cases, 6 were family members of previously identified cases, 5 were direct contacts of other positive cases, 2 cases were contacts of positive colleagues, 1 case was imported, 1 case from the Paceville cluster, 7 cases were from Saint Vincent DePaule, 7 cases were educators and 1 case was a student. Malta has 518 active cases. 2176 swab tests were conducted, a total of 265,630 since the start of the pandemic.

On 6 October, Malta recorded 47 new cases and 42 new recoveries. Regarding the previous day's cases, 28 were family members of previously identified cases, 1 was a direct contact of another positive case, 3 cases were contacts of positive colleagues, 2 cases from the Paceville cluster and 1 case was through social gatherings with other positive cases. Malta has 522 active cases. 1961 swab tests were conducted, a total of 267,591 since the start of the pandemic. It was also announced a 90-year-old woman died, becoming the 40th victim of the virus.

On 7 October, Malta recorded 68 new cases and 53 new recoveries. Regarding the previous day's cases, 12 were family members of previously identified cases, 8 cases were contacts of positive colleagues and 12 cases were through social gatherings with other positive cases. Malta has 536 active cases. 2497 swab tests were conducted, a total of 270,088 since the start of the pandemic. It was also announced a 96-year-old woman died, becoming the 41st victim of the virus.

On 8 October, Malta recorded 64 new cases and 19 new recoveries. Regarding the previous day's cases, 15 were family members of previously identified cases, 3 cases were contacts of positive colleagues, 7 were direct contacts of other positive cases, 1 case was through social gatherings with other positive cases, 2 cases from the Paceville cluster and 2 were imported cases. Malta has 581 active cases. 2491 swab tests were conducted, a total of 272,579 since the start of the pandemic.

On 9 October, Malta recorded 75 new cases and 31 new recoveries. Malta has 625 active cases. 2732 swab tests were conducted, a total of 275,311 since the start of the pandemic.

On 10 October, Malta recorded 100 new cases and 22 new recoveries. Regarding the previous day's cases, 19 were family members of previously identified cases, 2 cases were contacts with positive colleagues, 6 were direct contacts with other positive cases and 1 case was imported. At the time of writing, Malta has 703 active cases. 2315 swab tests were conducted, a total of 277,626 since the start of the pandemic.

On 11 October, Malta recorded 95 new cases and 30 new recoveries. Regarding the previous day's cases, 31 were family members of previously identified cases, 9 cases were contacts with positive colleagues, 5 were direct contacts with other positive cases and 2 cases were through social gatherings with other positive cases. At the time of writing, Malta has 768 active cases. 2529 swab tests were conducted, a total of 280,155 since the start of the pandemic. It was also announced a 67-year-old man died, becoming the 42nd victim of the virus.

On 12 October, Malta recorded 68 new cases and 14 new recoveries. Regarding the previous day's cases, 22 were family members of previously identified cases, 11 cases were contacts with positive colleagues, 2 were imported cases, 1 case came from the Paceville cluster, 1 was a direct contact with another positive case and 1 case was through social gatherings with other positive cases. At the time of writing, Malta has 820 active cases. 1940 swab tests were conducted, a total of 282,095 since the start of the pandemic. It was also announced another 67-year-old man died, becoming the 43rd victim of the virus.

On 13 October, Malta recorded 93 new cases and 31 new recoveries. Regarding the previous day's cases, 25 were family members of previously identified cases, 4 cases were contacts with positive colleagues, 2 were direct contacts with other positive cases and 1 was an imported case. At the time of writing, Malta has 881 active cases. 2257 swab tests were conducted, a total of 284,352 since the start of the pandemic. It was announced a 71-year-old man died, becoming the 44th victim of the virus.

On 14 October, Malta recorded 111 new cases and 52 new recoveries. Regarding the previous day's cases, 30 were family members of previously identified cases, 6 cases were contacts with positive colleagues and 1 case came from the Paceville cluster. At the time of writing, Malta has 940 active cases. 2761 swab tests were conducted, a total of 287,113 since the start of the pandemic. It was announced a 59-year-old man died, becoming the 45th victim of the virus.

On 15 October, Malta recorded 112 new cases and 42 new recoveries. Regarding the previous day's cases, 28 were family members of previously identified cases, 2 cases were contacts with positive colleagues, 2 cases were from Paceville, 5 cases were direct contacts with other positive cases and 1 case was imported. At time of writing, Malta has 1009 active cases. 2481 swab tests were conducted, a total of 289,594 since the start of the pandemic.

On 16 October, Malta recorded 122 new cases and 36 new recoveries. At time of writing, Malta has 1095 active cases. 2882 swab tests were conducted, a total of 292,476 since the start of the pandemic.

On 17 October, Malta recorded  204 new cases and 42 recoveries. Regarding the previous day's cases, 32 cases were family members of previously identified cases, 6 cases were contacts with positive colleagues, 5 cases were from Paceville, 7 cases were direct contacts with other positive cases and 2 cases was imported. At time of writing, Malta has 1257 active cases. 2885 swab tests were conducted, a total of 295,381 since the start of the pandemic.

On 18 October, Malta recorded 142 new cases and 52 recoveries. Regarding the previous day's cases, 46 cases were family members of previously identified cases, 18 cases were contacts with positive colleagues, 3 cases were from Paceville, 9 cases were direct contacts with other positive cases and 4 cases were from social gatherings with other positive cases. At time of writing, Malta has 1347 active cases. 2404 swab tests were conducted, a total of 297,765 since the start of the pandemic.

On 19 October, Malta recorded 109 new cases and 6 recoveries. Regarding the previous day's cases, 40 cases were family members of previously identified cases, 17 cases were contacts with positive colleagues, 7 cases were direct contacts with other positive cases, 6 cases were from social gatherings with other positive cases and 2 cases were imported. At time of writing, Malta has 1450 active cases. 2561 swab tests were conducted, a total of 300,326 since the start of the pandemic.

On 20 October, Malta recorded 134 new cases and 40 recoveries. Regarding the previous day's cases, 36 cases were family members of previously identified cases, 6 cases were contacts with positive colleagues, 10 cases were direct contacts with other positive cases, 6 cases were from social gatherings with other positive cases, 3 cases were imported and 2 cases were from Paceville. At time of writing, Malta has 1543 active cases. 2690 swab tests were conducted, a total of 303,016 since the start of the pandemic. In the morning, it was announced a 72-year-old woman died, becoming the 46th victim of the virus.

On 21 October, Malta recorded 155 new cases and 49 recoveries. Regarding the previous day's cases, 20 cases were family members of previously identified cases, 8 cases were contacts with positive colleagues, 12 cases were direct contacts with other positive cases, 14 cases were from social gatherings with other positive cases and 2 cases were imported. At time of writing, Malta has 1649 active cases. 2823 swab tests were conducted, a total of 305,839 since the start of the pandemic. In the afternoon, it was announced a 67-year-old man died, becoming the 47th victim of the virus.

On 22 October, Malta recorded 111 new cases and 53 recoveries. Regarding the previous day's cases, 14 cases were family members of previously identified cases, 10 cases were contacts with positive colleagues, 13 cases were direct contacts with other positive cases, 1 cases was from a social gathering with other positive cases and 2 cases were imported. At time of writing, Malta has 1704 active cases. 2951 swab tests were conducted, a total of 308,790 since the start of the pandemic. In the morning, it was announced a 72-year-old woman and an 82-year-old man died, becoming the 48th and 49th victims of the virus.

On 23 October, Malta recorded 121 new cases and 55 recoveries. At time of writing, Malta has 1770 active cases. 2685 swab tests were conducted, a total of 311,475 since the start of the pandemic.

On 24 October, Malta recorded 115 new cases and 39 recoveries. Regarding the previous day's cases, 43 cases were family members of previously identified cases, 12 cases were contacts with positive colleagues, 4 cases were direct contacts with other positive cases, 1 case was from a social gathering with other positive cases, 3 cases from Paceville and 4 cases were imported. At time of writing, Malta has 1845 active cases. 3144 swab tests were conducted, a total of 314,619 since the start of the pandemic. In the morning, it was announced a 77-year-old man died, becoming the 50th victim of the virus.

On 25 October, Malta recorded 125 new cases and 89 recoveries. Regarding the previous day's cases, 46 cases were family members of previously identified cases, 6 cases were contacts with positive colleagues, 2 cases were direct contacts with other positive cases, 1 case was from Paceville and 1 case was imported. At time of writing, Malta has 1880 active cases. 3285 swab tests were conducted, a total of 317,904 since the start of the pandemic. In the morning, it was announced an 82-year-old man died, becoming the 51st victim of the virus. Later on in the day, a 75-year-old man died becoming the 52nd victim of the virus.

On 26 October, Malta recorded 80 new cases and 63 recoveries. Regarding the previous day's cases, 31 cases were family members of previously identified cases, 8 cases were contacts with positive colleagues, 8 cases were direct contacts with other positive cases, 3 cases were from social gatherings with other positive cases, 1 case was from Paceville and 2 cases were imported. At time of writing, Malta has 1895 active cases. 2811 swab tests were conducted, a total of 320,715 since the start of the pandemic. In the morning, it was announced a 73-year-old man died, becoming the 53rd victim of the virus.

On 27 October, Malta recorded 107 new cases and 85 recoveries. Regarding the previous day's cases, 9 cases were family members of previously identified cases, 5 cases were contacts with positive colleagues, 5 cases were direct contacts with other positive cases, 2 cases were imported and 3 cases were from social gatherings with other positive cases. At time of writing, Malta has 1915 active cases. 2919 swab tests were conducted, a total of 323,634 since the start of the pandemic. In the morning, it was announced a 70-year-old man and an 88-year-old woman died, becoming the 54th and 55th victims of the virus.

On 28 October, Malta recorded 75 new cases and 74 recoveries. Regarding the previous day's cases, 11 cases were family members of previously identified cases, 4 cases were contacts with positive colleagues, 8 cases were direct contacts with other positive cases, 1 case was imported and 6 cases were from social gatherings with other positive cases. At time of writing, Malta has 1915 active cases. 2946 swab tests were conducted, a total of 326,580 since the start of the pandemic. In the morning, it was announced an 89-year-old woman died, becoming the 56th victim of the virus. Later on in the day, a 91-year-old man died, being the 57th victim of the virus on the island.

On 29 October, Malta recorded 106 new cases and 91 recoveries. Regarding the previous day's cases, 21 cases were family members of previously identified cases, 22 cases were contacts with positive colleagues, 7 cases were direct contacts with other positive cases, 2 cases were imported and 2 cases were from social gatherings with other positive cases. At time of writing, Malta has 1927 active cases. 2966 swab tests were conducted, a total of 329,546 since the start of the pandemic. In the morning, it was announced an 82-year-old man and a 66-year-old man died, becoming the 58th and 59th victims of the virus. Later on in the day, Fr Lino Cardona, a 76 year old priest who was also a teacher in Saint Aloysius College died becoming the 60th victim of the virus.

On 30 October, Malta recorded 76 new cases and 110 recoveries. At time of writing, Malta has 1891 active cases. 3075 swab tests were conducted, a total of 332,621 since the start of the pandemic. In the morning, it was announced a 68-year-old man died, becoming the 61st victim of the virus.

On 31 October, Malta recorded 100 new cases and 165 recoveries. Regarding the previous day's cases, 20 cases were family members of previously identified cases, 25 cases were contacts with positive colleagues and 10 cases were direct contacts with other positive cases. At time of writing, Malta has 1825 active cases. 3698 swab tests were conducted, a total of 336,319 since the start of the pandemic. In the morning, it was announced an 80-year-old woman died, becoming the 62nd victim of the virus.

November 

On 1 November, Malta recorded 140 new cases and 131 recoveries. Regarding the previous day's cases, 7 cases were family members of previously identified cases, 18 cases were contacts with positive colleagues, 5 cases were direct contacts with other positive cases, 3 cases were imported and 3 cases were from social gatherings with other positive cases. At time of writing, Malta has 1832 active cases. 3414 swab tests were conducted, a total of 339,733 since the start of the pandemic. In the morning, it was announced that Fr Edward Mercieca, an 80 year old Jesuit priest and a 91-year-old woman died, becoming the 63rd and 64th victims of the virus.

On 2 November, Malta recorded 218 new cases (a new record increase in the number of cases) and 111 recoveries. Regarding the previous day's cases, 11 cases were family members of previously identified cases, 12 cases were contacts with positive colleagues, 8 cases were direct contacts with other positive cases, 2 cases were imported and 5 cases were from social gatherings with other positive cases. At time of writing, Malta has 1937 active cases. 3557 swab tests were conducted, a total of 343,290 since the start of the pandemic.

On 3 November, Malta recorded 106 new cases and 108 recoveries. Regarding the previous day's cases, 23 cases were family members of previously identified cases, 10 cases were contacts with positive colleagues, 2 cases were direct contacts with other positive cases, 1 case was imported and 2 cases were from social gatherings with other positive cases. At time of writing, Malta has 1937 active cases. 2816 swab tests were conducted, a total of 346,106 since the start of the pandemic. In the evening, it was announced that an 82-year-old man died, becoming the 65th victim of the virus.

On 4 November, Malta recorded 84 new cases and 167 recoveries. Regarding the previous day's cases, 16 cases were family members of previously identified cases, 4 cases were contacts with positive colleagues, 7 cases were direct contacts with other positive cases, 2 cases were imported and 1 case was from a social gathering with other positive cases. At time of writing, Malta has 1853 active cases. 3044 swab tests were conducted, a total of 349,150 since the start of the pandemic. In the afternoon, it was announced an 87-year-old man and Fr Robbie Wirth, an 86-year-old Jesuit priest died, becoming the 66th and 67th victims of the virus. Later on in the day, an 83-year-old man and a 63-year-old man died becoming the 68th and 69th victims of the virus.

On 5 November, Malta recorded 174 new cases and 93 recoveries. Regarding the previous day's cases, 13 cases were family members of previously identified cases, 11 cases were contacts with positive colleagues, 3 cases were imported and 2 cases were from social gatherings with other positive cases. At time of writing, Malta has 1928 active cases. 2842 swab tests were conducted, a total of 351,992 since the start of the pandemic. In the morning, it was announced that a 75-year-old man died, becoming the 70th victim of the virus. Later on in the day, a 54-year-old man died becoming the 71st victim of the virus.

On 6 November, Malta recorded 129 new cases and 67 recoveries. At time of writing, Malta has 1988 active cases. 3523 swab tests were conducted, a total of 355,515 since the start of the pandemic. In the morning, it was announced a 75-year-old man and a 90-year-old woman died, becoming the 72nd and 73rd victims of the virus. Later on in the day, a 59-year-old man died becoming the 74th victim of the virus.

On 7 November, Malta recorded 146 new cases and 168 recoveries. Regarding the previous day's cases, 19 cases were family members of previously identified cases, 17 cases were contacts with positive colleagues, 11 cases were direct contacts with other positive cases and 7 cases were from social gatherings with other positive cases. At time of writing, Malta has 1965 active cases. 2941 swab tests were conducted, a total of 358,456 since the start of the pandemic. In the afternoon, it was announced that a 92-year-old man died becoming the 75th victim of the virus.

On 8 November, Malta recorded 102 new cases and 103 recoveries. Regarding the previous day's cases, 32 cases were family members of previously identified cases, 5 cases were contacts with positive colleagues, 2 cases were direct contacts with other positive cases and 2 cases were from social gatherings with other positive cases. At time of writing, Malta has 1962 active cases. 2942 swab tests were conducted, a total of 361,298 since the start of the pandemic. In the morning, a 91-year-old woman died becoming the 76th victim of the virus. Later on in the day, a 79-year-old man and a 71-year-old man died becoming the 77th and 78th victims of the virus.

On 9 November, Malta recorded 102 new cases and 82 recoveries. Regarding the previous day's cases, 9 cases were family members of previously identified cases, 12 cases were contacts with positive colleagues, 4 cases were direct contacts with other positive cases and 1 case was from a social gathering with other positive cases. At time of writing, Malta has 1980 active cases. 2851 swab tests were conducted, a total of 364,249 since the start of the pandemic. In the evening, it was announced that a 79-year-old man, an 87-year-old man and a 75-year-old man died becoming the 79th, 80th and 81st victims of the virus.

On 10 November, Malta recorded 153 new cases and 89 recoveries. Regarding the previous day's cases, 15 cases were family members of previously identified cases, 2 cases were contacts with positive colleagues, 6 cases were direct contacts with other positive cases, 2 cases were from social gatherings with other positive cases and 4 cases were imported. At time of writing, Malta has 2041 active cases. 3296 swab tests were conducted, a total of 367,545 since the start of the pandemic. In the evening, it was announced that a 74-year-old man, a 61-year-old man, an 83-year-old man and a 99-year-old man died becoming the 82nd, 83rd, 84th and 85th victims of the virus.

On 11 November, Malta recorded 141 new cases and 97 recoveries. Regarding the previous day's cases, 10 cases were family members of previously identified cases, 6 cases were contacts with positive colleagues and 5 cases were from social gatherings with other positive cases. At time of writing, Malta has 2081 active cases. 3014 swab tests were conducted, a total of 370,559 since the start of the pandemic. In the evening, it was announced that an 81-year-old man, a 77-year-old man and an 87-year-old man died becoming the 86th, 87th and 88th victims of the virus.

On 12 November, Malta recorded 109 new cases and 108 recoveries. Regarding the previous day's cases, 14 cases were family members of previously identified cases, 3 cases were contacts with positive colleagues and 5 cases were direct contacts with other positive cases. At time of writing, Malta has 2079 active cases. 3460 swab tests were conducted, a total of 374,019 since the start of the pandemic. In the evening, it was announced that an 82-year-old man and a 78-year-old man died becoming the 89th and 90th victims of the virus.

On 13 November, Malta recorded 150 new cases and 101 recoveries. At time of writing, Malta has 2124 active cases. 3035 swab tests were conducted, a total of 377,054 since the start of the pandemic. At noon, it was announced that a 95-year-old man and a 79-year-old man died becoming the 91st and 92nd victims of the virus. Later on in the day, an 84-year-old man, an 82-year-old man and Renald Falzon, a 46 year old mayor of Qormi died becoming the 93rd, 94th and 95th victims of the virus.

On 14 November, Malta recorded 121 new cases and 122 recoveries. Regarding the previous day's cases, 25 cases were family members of previously identified cases, 9 cases were contacts with positive colleagues and 5 cases were direct contacts with other positive cases. At time of writing, Malta has 2120 active cases. 2955 swab tests were conducted, a total of 380,009 since the start of the pandemic. In the evening, it was announced that a 79-year-old woman and an 88-year-old woman died becoming the 96th and 97th victims of the virus.

On 15 November, Malta recorded 117 new cases and 63 recoveries. Regarding the previous day's cases, 19 cases were family members of previously identified cases, 2 cases were contacts with positive colleagues, 2 cases were direct contacts with other positive cases and 1 case was imported. At time of writing, Malta has 2172 active cases. 3120 swab tests were conducted, a total of 383,129 since the start of the pandemic. In the evening, it was announced that a 64-year-old man died becoming the 98th victim of the virus.

On 16 November, Malta recorded 103 new cases and 123 recoveries. Regarding the previous day's cases, 14 cases were family members of previously identified cases, 8 cases were contacts with positive colleagues, 3 cases were direct contacts with other positive cases and 2 cases were imported. At time of writing, Malta has 2151 active cases. 3189 swab tests were conducted, a total of 386,318 since the start of the pandemic. In the evening, it was announced that a 78-year-old man, an 87-year-old man and a 79-year-old man died becoming the 99th, 100th and 101st victims of the virus.

On 17 November, Malta recorded 110 new cases and 161 recoveries. Regarding the previous day's cases, 26 cases were family members of previously identified cases, 9 cases were contacts with positive colleagues, 4 cases were direct contacts with other positive cases and 2 cases were from social gatherings with other positive cases. At time of writing, Malta has 2097 active cases. 2345 swab tests were conducted, a total of 388,663 since the start of the pandemic. In the evening, it was announced that an 83-year-old man and a 70-year-old woman died becoming the 102nd and 103rd victims of the virus.

On 18 November, Malta recorded 173 new cases and 135 recoveries. Regarding the previous day's cases, 32 cases were family members of previously identified cases, 14 cases were contacts with positive colleagues, 6 cases were direct contacts with other positive cases and 2 cases were from social gatherings with other positive cases. At time of writing, Malta has 2133 active cases. 3380 swab tests were conducted, a total of 392,043 since the start of the pandemic. In the evening, it was announced that a 74-year-old man died becoming the 104th victims of the virus.

On 19 November, Malta recorded 140 new cases and 117 recoveries. Regarding the previous day's cases, 22 cases were family members of previously identified cases, 18 cases were contacts with positive colleagues and 14 cases were direct contacts with other positive cases. At time of writing, Malta has 2155 active cases. 3093 swab tests were conducted, a total of 395,136 since the start of the pandemic. In the evening, it was announced that a 75-year-old man and a 73-year-old man died becoming the 105th and 106th victims of the virus.

On 20 November, Malta recorded 121 new cases and 105 recoveries. At time of writing, Malta has 2167 active cases. 3377 swab tests were conducted, a total of 398,513 since the start of the pandemic. In the afternoon, it was announced that an 86-year-old woman and a 75-year-old woman died becoming the 107th and 108th victims of the virus.

On 21 November, Malta recorded 141 new cases and 159 recoveries. Regarding the previous day's cases, 20 cases were family members of previously identified cases, 21 cases were contacts with positive colleagues and 11 cases were direct contacts with other positive cases. At time of writing, Malta has 2146 active cases. 3391 swab tests were conducted, a total of 401,904 since the start of the pandemic. In the morning, it was announced that an 80-year-old man, an 82-year-old woman and a 70-year-old man died becoming the 109th, 110th and 111th victims of the virus.

On 22 November, Malta recorded 102 new cases and 89 recoveries. Regarding the previous day's cases, 31 cases were family members of previously identified cases, 14 cases were contacts with positive colleagues and 8 cases were direct contacts with other positive cases. At time of writing, Malta has 2159 active cases. 3221 swab tests were conducted, a total of 405,125 since the start of the pandemic. In the evening, it was announced that a 98-year-old man and a 67-year-old man died becoming the 112th and 113th victims of the virus.

On 23 November, Malta recorded 80 new cases and 117 recoveries. Regarding the previous day's cases, 25 cases were family members of previously identified cases, 3 cases were contacts with positive colleagues and 10 cases were direct contacts with other positive cases. At time of writing, Malta has 2060 active cases. 2192 swab tests were conducted, a total of 407,317 since the start of the pandemic. In the afternoon, it was announced that a 94-year-old woman, a 75-year-old man, a 71-year-old woman and an 80-year-old man died becoming the 114th, 115th, 116th and 117th victims of the virus.

On 24 November, Malta recorded 133 new cases and 107 recoveries. Regarding the previous day's cases, 16 cases were family members of previously identified cases, 5 cases were contacts with positive colleagues, 3 cases were direct contacts with other positive cases and 1 case was from a social gathering with other positive cases. At time of writing, Malta has 2082 active cases. 2664 swab tests were conducted, a total of 409,981 since the start of the pandemic. In the afternoon, it was announced that a 76-year-old man, an 82-year-old man, an 88-year-old man, a 75-year-old woman and an 83-year-old man died becoming the 118th, 119th, 120th, 121st and 122nd victims of the virus.

On 25 November, Malta recorded 116 new cases and 124 recoveries. Regarding the previous day's cases, 25 cases were family members of previously identified cases, 4 cases were contacts with positive colleagues, 5 cases were direct contacts with other positive cases and 3 cases were from social gatherings with other positive cases. At time of writing, Malta has 2069 active cases. 3030 swab tests were conducted, a total of 413,011 since the start of the pandemic. In the afternoon, it was announced that a 70-year-old man, an 87-year-old man and a 67-year-old man died becoming the 123rd, 124th and 125th victims of the virus.

On 26 November, Malta recorded 152 new cases and 103 recoveries. Regarding the previous day's cases, 23 cases were family members of previously identified cases, 5 cases were contacts with positive colleagues, 4 cases were direct contacts with other positive cases and 2 cases were from social gatherings with other positive cases. At time of writing, Malta has 2115 active cases. 2960 swab tests were conducted, a total of 415,971 since the start of the pandemic. In the evening, it was announced that a 70-year-old man, a 73-year-old woman and an 80-year-old man died becoming the 126th, 127th and 128th victims of the virus.

On 27 November, Malta recorded 96 new cases and 132 recoveries. At time of writing, Malta has 2076 active cases. 3049 swab tests were conducted, a total of 419,020 since the start of the pandemic. In the afternoon, it was announced that an 85-year-old woman, a 73-year-old man, a 72-year-old man and an 81-year-old man died becoming the 129th, 130th, 131st and 132nd victims of the virus.

On 28 November, Malta recorded 108 new cases and 121 recoveries. Regarding the previous day's cases, 32 cases were family members of previously identified cases, 2 cases were contacts with positive colleagues and 3 cases were from social gatherings with other positive cases. At time of writing, Malta has 2059 active cases. 2870 swab tests were conducted, a total of 421,890 since the start of the pandemic. In the evening, it was announced that a 76-year-old man died becoming the 133rd victim of the virus.

On 29 November, Malta recorded 143 new cases and 139 recoveries. Regarding the previous day's cases, 22 cases were family members of previously identified cases, 4 cases were contacts with positive colleagues and 2 cases were direct contacts with other positive cases. At time of writing, Malta has 2062 active cases. 3033 swab tests were conducted, a total of 424,923 since the start of the pandemic.

On 30 November, Malta recorded 121 new cases and 108 recoveries. Regarding the previous day's cases, 19 cases were family members of previously identified cases, 9 cases were contacts with positive colleagues and 3 cases were direct contacts with other positive cases. At time of writing, Malta has 2071 active cases. 3091 swab tests were conducted, a total of 428,014 since the start of the pandemic. In the morning, it was announced that a 75-year-old woman, a 94-year-old man, a 90-year-old woman and a 74-year-old man died becoming the 134th, 135th, 136th and 137th victims of the virus.

December 

On 1 December, Malta recorded 102 new cases and 83 recoveries. Regarding the previous day's cases, 22 cases were family members of previously identified cases, 7 cases were contacts with positive colleagues, 2 cases were direct contacts with other positive cases, 3 cases were from social gatherings with other positive cases and 9 cases were imported. At time of writing, Malta has 2086 active cases. 2768 swab tests were conducted, a total of 430,782 since the start of the pandemic. In the morning, it was announced that a 79-year-old woman, an 80-year-old woman, a 73-year-old man and a 67-year-old man died becoming the 138th, 139th, 140th and 141st victims of the virus.

On 2 December, Malta recorded 126 new cases and 139 recoveries. Regarding the previous day's cases, 20 cases were family members of previously identified cases, 11 cases were contacts with positive colleagues, 6 cases were direct contacts with other positive cases, 7 cases were from social gatherings with other positive cases and 1 case was imported. At time of writing, Malta has 2068 active cases. 2668 swab tests were conducted, a total of 433,468 since the start of the pandemic. In the morning, it was announced that a 77-year-old man, an 80-year-old man, a 74-year-old man, an 80-year-old woman and a 91-year-old woman died becoming the 142nd, 143rd, 144th, 145th and 146th victims of the virus.

On 3 December, Malta recorded 96 new cases and 128 recoveries. Regarding the previous day's cases, 23 cases were family members of previously identified cases, 8 cases were contacts with positive colleagues, 9 cases were direct contacts with other positive cases and 4 cases were from social gatherings with other positive cases. At time of writing, Malta has 2034 active cases. 2909 swab tests were conducted, a total of 436,377 since the start of the pandemic. In the morning, it was announced that a 64-year-old man and a 74-year-old man died becoming the 147th and 148th victims of the virus.

On 4 December, Malta recorded 123 new cases and 105 recoveries. At time of writing, Malta has 2051 active cases. 3100 swab tests were conducted, a total of 439,477 since the start of the pandemic. In the morning, it was announced that an 82-year-old man died becoming the 149th victims of the virus.

On 5 December, Malta recorded 103 new cases and 169 recoveries. Regarding the previous day's cases, 18 cases were family members of previously identified cases, 6 cases were contacts with positive colleagues, 4 cases were direct contacts with other positive cases and 2 cases were from social gatherings with other positive cases. At time of writing, Malta has 1985 active cases. 3010 swab tests were conducted, a total of 442,487 since the start of the pandemic. In the afternoon, it was announced that a 69-year-old man and an 81-year-old man died becoming the 150th and 151st victims of the virus.

On 6 December, Malta recorded 97 new cases and 107 recoveries. Regarding the previous day's cases, 22 cases were family members of previously identified cases, 8 cases were contacts with positive colleagues, 2 cases were direct contacts with other positive cases and 2 cases were from social gatherings with other positive cases. At time of writing, Malta has 1973 active cases. 2907 swab tests were conducted, a total of 445,394 since the start of the pandemic. In the afternoon, it was announced that a 69-year-old man and an 81-year-old man died becoming the 152nd and 153rd victims of the virus.

On 7 December, Malta recorded 139 new cases and 101 recoveries. Regarding the previous day's cases, 26 cases were family members of previously identified cases, 4 cases were contacts with positive colleagues and 5 cases were direct contacts with other positive cases. At time of writing, Malta has 2007 active cases. 3192 swab tests were conducted, a total of 448,586 since the start of the pandemic. In the afternoon, it was announced that a 69-year-old woman and an 81-year-old woman died becoming the 154th and 155th victims of the virus.

On 8 December, Malta recorded 40 new cases and 144 recoveries. Regarding the previous day's cases, 18 cases were family members of previously identified cases, 17 cases were contacts with positive colleagues and 11 cases were direct contacts with other positive cases. At time of writing, Malta has 1901 active cases. 1776 swab tests were conducted, a total of 450,362 since the start of the pandemic. In the morning, it was announced that a 77-year-old man and an 89-year-old woman died becoming the 156th and 157th victims of the virus.

On 9 December, Malta recorded 79 new cases and 79 recoveries. Regarding the previous day's cases, 18 cases were family members of previously identified cases, 5 cases were contacts with positive colleagues and 3 cases were direct contacts with other positive cases. At time of writing, Malta has 1898 active cases. 2909 swab tests were conducted, a total of 453,271 since the start of the pandemic. In the morning, it was announced that an 83-year-old man, a 90-year-old man and a 90-year-old woman died becoming the 158th, 159th and 160th victims of the virus.

On 10 December, Malta recorded 106 new cases and 128 recoveries. Regarding the previous day's cases, 44 cases were family members of previously identified cases, 11 cases were contacts with positive colleagues and 2 cases were direct contacts with other positive cases. At time of writing, Malta has 1872 active cases. 2626 swab tests were conducted, a total of 455,897 since the start of the pandemic. In the morning, it was announced that a 92-year-old woman, 66-year-old woman, an 85-year-old woman and a 91-year-old man died becoming the 161st, 162nd, 163rd and 164th victims of the virus.

On 11 December, Malta recorded 96 new cases and 87 recoveries. At time of writing, Malta has 1872 active cases. 2626 swab tests were conducted, a total of 455,897 since the start of the pandemic. At time of writing, Malta has 1879 active cases. 2840 swab tests were conducted, a total of 458,737 since the start of the pandemic. In the morning, it was announced that a 75-year-old man and a 96-year-old man died becoming the 165th and 166th victims of the virus.

On 12 December, Malta recorded 121 new cases and 144 recoveries. Regarding the previous day's cases, 19 cases were family members of previously identified cases, 14 cases were contacts with positive colleagues, 8 cases were direct contacts with other positive cases and 2 cases were from social gatherings with other positive cases. At time of writing, Malta has 1856 active cases. 3033 swab tests were conducted, a total of 461,770 since the start of the pandemic.

On 13 December, Malta recorded 52 new cases and 90 recoveries. Regarding the previous day's cases, 26 cases were family members of previously identified cases, 19 cases were contacts with positive colleagues, 14 cases were direct contacts with other positive cases and 4 cases were from social gatherings with other positive cases. At time of writing, Malta has 1815 active cases. 2659 swab tests were conducted, a total of 464,429 since the start of the pandemic. In the morning, it was announced that a 68-year-old man, a 78-year-old man and an 87-year-old woman died becoming the 167th, 168th and 169th victims of the virus.

On 14 December, Malta recorded 101 new cases and 150 recoveries. Regarding the previous day's cases, 19 cases were family members of previously identified cases, 7 cases were contacts with positive colleagues, 2 cases were direct contacts with other positive cases and 2 cases were from social gatherings with other positive cases. At time of writing, Malta has 1761 active cases. 2978 swab tests were conducted, a total of 467,407 since the start of the pandemic. In the morning, it was announced that a 76-year-old woman, a 66-year-old man, a 79-year-old man, an 88-year-old man and a 94-year-old woman died becoming the 170th, 171st, 172nd, 173rd and 174th victims of the virus.

On 15 December, Malta recorded 49 new cases and 101 recoveries. Regarding the previous day's cases, 34 cases were family members of previously identified cases, 19 cases were contacts with positive colleagues, 4 cases were direct contacts with other positive cases and 4 cases were from social gatherings with other positive cases. At time of writing, Malta has 1706 active cases. 2446 swab tests were conducted, a total of 469,853 since the start of the pandemic. In the morning, it was announced that a 99-year-old woman, a 94-year-old man and an 86-year-old man died becoming the 175th, 176th and 177th victims of the virus.

On 16 December, Malta recorded 112 new cases and 96 recoveries. Regarding the previous day's cases, 15 cases were family members of previously identified cases, 9 cases were contacts with positive colleagues, 2 cases were direct contacts with other positive cases and 2 cases were from social gatherings with other positive cases. At time of writing, Malta has 1719 active cases. 3049 swab tests were conducted, a total of 472,902 since the start of the pandemic. In the morning, it was announced that a 79-year-old woman, a 90-year-old woman and a 75-year-old woman died becoming the 178th, 179th and 180th victims of the virus.

On 17 December, Malta recorded 60 new cases and 154 recoveries. Regarding the previous day's cases, 26 cases were family members of previously identified cases, 18 cases were contacts with positive colleagues, 9 cases were direct contacts with other positive cases and 4 cases were from social gatherings with other positive cases. At time of writing, Malta has 1623 active cases. 2637 swab tests were conducted, a total of 475,539 since the start of the pandemic. In the morning, it was announced that a 93-year-old woman and an 83-year-old woman died becoming the 181st and 182nd victims of the virus.

On 18 December, Malta recorded 94 new cases and 110 recoveries. At time of writing, Malta has 1606 active cases. 3558 swab tests were conducted, a total of 479,097 since the start of the pandemic. In the morning, it was announced that a 93-year-old woman died becoming the 183rd victim of the virus.

On 19 December, Malta recorded 52 new cases and 101 recoveries. Regarding the previous day's cases, 20 cases were family members of previously identified cases, 13 cases were contacts with positive colleagues, 7 cases were direct contacts with other positive cases and 3 cases were from social gatherings with other positive cases. At time of writing, Malta has 1553 active cases. 2612 swab tests were conducted, a total of 481,709 since the start of the pandemic. In the morning, it was announced that a 76-year-old woman, a 79-year-old man, an 88-year-old man and a 94-year-old woman died becoming the 184th, 185th, 186th and 187th victims of the virus.

On 20 December, Malta recorded 93 new cases and 97 recoveries. Regarding the previous day's cases, 13 cases were family members of previously identified cases, 3 cases were contacts with positive colleagues, 2 cases were direct contacts with other positive cases and 3 cases were from social gatherings with other positive cases. At time of writing, Malta has 1546 active cases. 3941 swab tests were conducted, a total of 485,650 since the start of the pandemic. In the morning, it was announced that an 86-year-old woman, a 69-year-old man and an 87-year-old woman died becoming the 188th, 189th and 190th victims of the virus.

On 21 December, Malta recorded 88 new cases and 137 recoveries. Regarding the previous day's cases, 16 cases were family members of previously identified cases, 12 cases were contacts with positive colleagues, 6 cases were direct contacts with other positive cases and 4 cases were from social gatherings with other positive cases. At time of writing, Malta has 1493 active cases. 2868 swab tests were conducted, a total of 488,518 since the start of the pandemic. In the morning, it was announced that 2 72-year-old women, a 78-year-old man and a 75-year-old man died becoming the 191st, 192nd, 193rd and 194th victims of the virus.

On 22 December, Malta recorded 108 new cases and 46 recoveries. Regarding the previous day's cases, 21 cases were family members of previously identified cases, 10 cases were contacts with positive colleagues, 9 cases were direct contacts with other positive cases and 5 cases were from social gatherings with other positive cases. At time of writing, Malta has 1553 active cases. 2788 swab tests were conducted, a total of 491,306 since the start of the pandemic. In the morning, it was announced that a 78-year-old man and a 75-year-old man died becoming the 195th and 196th victims of the virus.

On 23 December, Malta recorded 82 new cases and 132 recoveries. At time of writing, Malta has 1498 active cases. 2609 swab tests were conducted, a total of 493,915 since the start of the pandemic. In the morning, it was announced that a 66-year-old woman, an 82-year-old woman, a 66-year-old man, an 85-year-old man and a 69-year-old man died becoming the 197th, 198th, 199th, 200th and 201st victims of the virus.

On 24 December, Malta recorded 70 new cases and 130 recoveries. Regarding the previous day's cases, 23 cases were family members of previously identified cases, 8 cases were contacts with positive colleagues, 7 cases were direct contacts with other positive cases and 3 cases were from social gatherings with other positive cases. At time of writing, Malta has 1436 active cases. 2928 swab tests were conducted, a total of 496,843 since the start of the pandemic. In the morning, it was announced that a 78-year-old man and a 75-year-old man died becoming the 202nd and 203rd victims of the virus.

On 25 December, Malta recorded 50 new cases and 124 recoveries. Regarding the previous day's cases, 25 cases were family members of previously identified cases, 9 cases were contacts with positive colleagues, 14 cases were direct contacts with other positive cases and 5 cases were from social gatherings with other positive cases. At time of writing, Malta has 1362 active cases. 2497 swab tests were conducted, a total of 499,340 since the start of the pandemic.

On 26 December, Malta recorded 129 new cases and 3 recoveries. Regarding the previous day's cases, 15 cases were family members of previously identified cases, 4 cases were contacts with positive colleagues, 2 cases were direct contacts with other positive cases and 3 cases were from social gatherings with other positive cases. At time of writing, Malta has 1485 active cases. 2071 swab tests were conducted, a total of 501,411 since the start of the pandemic. In the morning, it was announced that a 78-year-old man, a 73-year-old woman and a 75-year-old man died becoming the 204th, 205th and 206th victims of the virus.

On 27 December, Malta recorded 84 new cases and 118 recoveries. Regarding the previous day's cases, 33 cases were family members of previously identified cases, 15 cases were contacts with positive colleagues, 16 cases were direct contacts with other positive cases and 10 cases were from social gatherings with other positive cases. At time of writing, Malta has 1447 active cases. 2249 swab tests were conducted, a total of 503,660 since the start of the pandemic. In the morning, it was announced that a 74-year-old woman, an 80-year-old woman, an 89-year-old woman and an 86-year-old woman died becoming the 207th, 208th, 209th and 210th victims of the virus.

On 28 December, Malta recorded 101 new cases and 123 recoveries. Regarding the previous day's cases, 22 cases were family members of previously identified cases, 9 cases were contacts with positive colleagues, 18 cases were direct contacts with other positive cases and 8 cases were from social gatherings with other positive cases. At time of writing, Malta has 1420 active cases. 2399 swab tests were conducted, a total of 506,059 since the start of the pandemic. In the morning, it was announced that a 74-year-old woman, a 91-year-old man, an 80-year-old woman, an 89-year-old woman and an 86-year-old woman died becoming the 211th, 212th, 213th, 214th and 215th victims of the virus.

On 29 December, Malta recorded 115 new cases and 128 recoveries. Regarding the previous day's cases, 34 cases were family members of previously identified cases, 18 cases were contacts with positive colleagues, 7 cases were direct contacts with other positive cases and 8 cases were from social gatherings with other positive cases. At time of writing, Malta has 1407 active cases. 2797 swab tests were conducted, a total of 508,856 since the start of the pandemic.

On 30 December, Malta recorded 124 new cases and 138 recoveries. Charmaine Gauci has confirmed that there are the first 3 cases of a UK-variant in Malta. Two are foreigners who came to Malta from the UK on 17 December and tested positive upon arrival and were quarantined immediately. The other case is a Maltese person, with investigation here still ongoing. At time of writing, Malta has 1392 active cases. 3043 swab tests were conducted, a total of 511,899 since the start of the pandemic. In the morning, it was announced that a 74-year-old man died becoming the 216th victim of the virus.

On 31 December, Malta recorded 109 new cases and 64 recoveries. Regarding the previous day's cases, 35 cases were family members of previously identified cases, 14 cases were contacts with positive colleagues, 12 cases were direct contacts with other positive cases and 10 cases were from social gatherings with other positive cases. At time of writing, Malta has 1434 active cases. 2858 swab tests were conducted, a total of 514,757 since the start of the pandemic. In the morning, it was announced that an 83-year-old man, a 67-year-old man and an 87-year-old woman died becoming the 217th, 218th and 219th victims of the virus.

2021

January 
On 1 January, Malta recorded 135 new cases and 57 recoveries. Regarding the previous day's cases, 36 cases were family members of previously identified cases, 14 cases were contacts with positive colleagues, 10 cases were direct contacts with other positive cases and 19 cases were from social gatherings with other positive cases. At time of writing, Malta has 1512 active cases. 2779 swab tests were conducted, a total of 517,536 since the start of the pandemic.

On 2 January, Malta recorded 88 new cases and 33 recoveries. Regarding the previous day's cases, 23 cases were family members of previously identified cases, 7 cases were contacts with positive colleagues, 9 cases were direct contacts with other positive cases and 7 cases were from social gatherings with other positive cases. At time of writing, Malta has 1566 active cases. 1810 swab tests were conducted, a total of 519,346 since the start of the pandemic. In the morning, it was announced that a 74-year-old man died becoming the 220th victim of the virus.

On 3 January, Malta recorded 85 new cases and 64 recoveries. Regarding the previous day's cases, 18 cases were family members of previously identified cases, 9 cases were contacts with positive colleagues, 4 cases were direct contacts with other positive cases and 3 cases were from social gatherings with other positive cases. At time of writing, Malta has 1587 active cases. 1995 swab tests were conducted, a total of 521,341 since the start of the pandemic.

On 4 January, Malta recorded 148 new cases and 111 recoveries. Regarding the previous day's cases, 17 cases were family members of previously identified cases, 4 cases were contacts with positive colleagues, 2 cases were direct contacts with other positive cases and 5 cases were from social gatherings with other positive cases. At time of writing, Malta has 1622 active cases. 2915 swab tests were conducted, a total of 524,256 since the start of the pandemic. In the morning, it was announced that a 73-year-old woman and an 81-year-old woman died becoming the 221st and 222nd victims of the virus.

On 5 January, Malta recorded 158 new cases and 78 recoveries. Regarding the previous day's cases, 30 cases were family members of previously identified cases, 8 cases were contacts with positive colleagues, 16 cases were direct contacts with other positive cases and 10 cases were from social gatherings with other positive cases. At time of writing, Malta has 1702 active cases. 2602 swab tests were conducted, a total of 526,858 since the start of the pandemic. In the morning, it was announced that a 96-year-old woman, a 72-year-old woman, an 83-year-old man and an 85-year-old woman died becoming the 223rd, 224th, 225th and 226th victims of the virus.

On 6 January, Malta recorded 224 new cases and 80 recoveries. Regarding the previous day's cases, 32 cases were family members of previously identified cases, 10 cases were contacts with positive colleagues, 20 cases were direct contacts with other positive cases and 12 cases were from social gatherings with other positive cases. At time of writing, Malta has 1845 active cases. 3365 swab tests were conducted, a total of 530,223 since the start of the pandemic. In the morning, it was announced that a 66-year-old woman died becoming the 227th victim of the virus.

On 7 January, Malta recorded 164 new cases and 73 recoveries. Regarding the previous day's cases, 54 cases were family members of previously identified cases, 24 cases were contacts with positive colleagues, 10 cases were direct contacts with other positive cases and 11 cases were from social gatherings with other positive cases. At time of writing, Malta has 1935 active cases. 2806 swab tests were conducted, a total of 533,029 since the start of the pandemic. In the morning, it was announced that a 74-year-old woman died becoming the 228th victim of the virus.

On 8 January, Malta recorded 191 new cases and 77 recoveries. At time of writing, Malta has 2047 active cases. 3639 swab tests were conducted, a total of 536,668 since the start of the pandemic. In the morning, it was announced that an 84-year-old woman and a 77-year-old woman died becoming the 229th and 230th victims of the virus.

On 9 January, Malta recorded 245 new cases and 69 recoveries. Regarding the previous day's cases, 40 cases were family members of previously identified cases, 22 cases were contacts with positive colleagues, 15 cases were direct contacts with other positive cases and 13 cases were from social gatherings with other positive cases. At time of writing, Malta has 2221 active cases. 3592 swab tests were conducted, a total of 540,260 since the start of the pandemic. In the morning, it was announced that an 85-year-old man and a 77-year-old woman died becoming the 231st and 232nd victims of the virus.

On 10 January, Malta recorded 184 new cases and 82 recoveries. Regarding the previous day's cases, 49 cases were family members of previously identified cases, 20 cases were contacts with positive colleagues, 18 cases were direct contacts with other positive cases and 15 cases were from social gatherings with other positive cases. At time of writing, Malta has 2322 active cases. 3298 swab tests were conducted, a total of 543,558 since the start of the pandemic. In the morning, it was announced that a 91-year-old man died becoming the 233rd victim of the virus.

On 11 January, Malta recorded 133 new cases and 95 recoveries. Regarding the previous day's cases, 46 cases were family members of previously identified cases, 19 cases were contacts with positive colleagues, 8 cases were direct contacts with other positive cases and 13 cases were from social gatherings with other positive cases. At time of writing, Malta has 2360 active cases. 3355 swab tests were conducted, a total of 546,913 since the start of the pandemic.

On 12 January, Malta recorded 240 new cases and 80 recoveries. Regarding the previous day's cases, 42 cases were family members of previously identified cases, 11 cases were contacts with positive colleagues, 6 cases were direct contacts with other positive cases and 11 cases were from social gatherings with other positive cases. At time of writing, Malta has 2519 active cases. 3354 swab tests were conducted, a total of 550,267 since the start of the pandemic. In the morning, it was announced that a 91-year-old man died becoming the 234th victim of the virus.

On 13 January, Malta recorded 189 new cases and 107 recoveries. Regarding the previous day's cases, 45 cases were family members of previously identified cases, 15 cases were contacts with positive colleagues, 6 cases were direct contacts with other positive cases and 15 cases were from social gatherings with other positive cases. At time of writing, Malta has 2601 active cases. 3405 swab tests were conducted, a total of 553,672 since the start of the pandemic.

On 14 January, Malta recorded 121 new cases and 127 recoveries. Regarding the previous day's cases, 42 cases were family members of previously identified cases, 11 cases were contacts with positive colleagues, 9 cases were direct contacts with other positive cases and 12 cases were from social gatherings with other positive cases. At time of writing, Malta has 2594 active cases. 3512 swab tests were conducted, a total of 557,184 since the start of the pandemic. In the morning, it was announced that a 91-year-old man died becoming the 235th victim of the virus.

On 15 January, Malta recorded 193 new cases and 143 recoveries. At time of writing, Malta has 2643 active cases. 3602 swab tests were conducted, a total of 560,786 since the start of the pandemic. In the morning, it was announced that an 89-year-old woman died becoming the 236th victim of the virus.

On 16 January, Malta recorded 175 new cases and 67 recoveries. Regarding the previous day's cases, 49 cases were family members of previously identified cases, 15 cases were contacts with positive colleagues, 12 cases were direct contacts with other positive cases and 15 cases were from social gatherings with other positive cases. At time of writing, Malta has 2749 active cases. 3293 swab tests were conducted, a total of 564,079 since the start of the pandemic. In the morning, it was announced that an 89-year-old woman and a 91-year-old man died becoming the 237th and 238th victim of the virus.

On 17 January, Malta recorded 141 new cases and 136 recoveries. Regarding the previous day's cases, 38 cases were family members of previously identified cases, 31 cases were contacts with positive colleagues, 18 cases were direct contacts with other positive cases and 29 cases were from social gatherings with other positive cases. At time of writing, Malta has 2753 active cases. 2866 swab tests were conducted, a total of 566,945 since the start of the pandemic. In the morning, it was announced that an 89-year-old man died becoming the 239th victim of the virus.

On 18 January, Malta recorded 154 new cases and 121 recoveries. At time of writing, Malta has 2784 active cases. 3239 swab tests were conducted, a total of 570,184 since the start of the pandemic and 11,705 vaccine doses were administered. In the morning, it was announced that a 73-year-old man and an 84-year-old man died becoming the 240th and 241st victims of the virus.

On 19 January, Malta recorded 200 new cases and 148 recoveries. At time of writing, Malta has 2835 active cases. 3481 swab tests were conducted, a total of 573,665 since the start of the pandemic and 13,002 vaccine doses were administered. In the morning, it was announced that an 84-year-old woman died becoming the 242nd victim of the virus.

On 20 January, Malta recorded 187 new cases and 189 recoveries. At time of writing, Malta has 2831 active cases. 3879 swab tests were conducted, a total of 577,544 since the start of the pandemic and 14,276 vaccine doses were administered. In the morning, it was announced that a 79-year-old woman and a 91-year-old man died becoming the 243rd and 244th victims of the virus.

On 21 January, Malta recorded 151 new cases and 180 recoveries. At time of writing, Malta has 2801 active cases. 3208 swab tests were conducted, a total of 580,752 since the start of the pandemic and 15,316 vaccine doses were administered. In the morning, it was announced that an 82-year-old woman died becoming the 245th victim of the virus.

On 22 January, Malta recorded 143 new cases and 201 recoveries. At time of writing, Malta has 2740 active cases. 3111 swab tests were conducted, a total of 583,863 since the start of the pandemic and 16,531 vaccine doses were administered. In the morning, it was announced that a 92-year-old woman, a 93-year-old woman and a 100-year-old woman died becoming the 246th, 247th and 248th victims of the virus.

On 23 January, Malta recorded 119 new cases and 211 recoveries. At time of writing, Malta has 2646 active cases. 2571 swab tests were conducted, a total of 586,434 since the start of the pandemic and 17,767 vaccine doses were administered. In the morning, it was announced that an 89-year-old woman and a 77-year-old man died becoming the 249th and 250th victims of the virus.

On 24 January, Malta recorded 116 new cases and 155 recoveries. At time of writing, Malta has 2606 active cases. 3111 swab tests were conducted, a total of 589,545 since the start of the pandemic and 18,930 vaccine doses were administered. In the morning, it was announced that an 81-year-old man died becoming the 251st victim of the virus.

On 25 January, Malta recorded 203 new cases and 175 recoveries. At time of writing, Malta has 2632 active cases. 3345 swab tests were conducted, a total of 592,890 since the start of the pandemic and 19,981 vaccine doses were administered, The number of second doses rose to 1,198. In the morning, it was announced that a 76-year-old woman and a 79-year-old man died becoming the 252nd and 253rd victims of the virus.

On 26 January, Malta recorded 138 new cases and 128 recoveries. At time of writing, Malta has 2640 active cases. 3248 swab tests were conducted, a total of 596,138 since the start of the pandemic and 21,172 vaccine doses were administered. The number of second doses rose to 1,463. In the morning, it was announced that an 80-year-old woman and an 88-year-old man died becoming the 254th and 255th victims of the virus.

On 27 January, Malta recorded 193 new cases and 148 recoveries. At time of writing, Malta has 2682 active cases. 3323 swab tests were conducted, a total of 599,461 since the start of the pandemic and 22,371 vaccine doses were administered. The number of second doses rose to 1,694. In the morning, it was announced that an 83-year-old man, a 68-year-old man and an 86-year-old woman died becoming the 256th, 257th and 258th victims of the virus.

On 28 January, Malta recorded 208 new cases and 200 recoveries. At time of writing, Malta has 2687 active cases. 3565 swab tests were conducted, a total of 603,026 since the start of the pandemic and 23,512 vaccine doses were administered. The number of second doses rose to 2,095. In the morning, it was announced that an 87-year-old man, a 69-year-old man and an 87-year-old woman died becoming the 259th, 260th and 261st victims of the virus.

On 29 January, Malta recorded 185 new cases and 174 recoveries. At time of writing, Malta has 2695 active cases. 3280 swab tests were conducted, a total of 606,306 since the start of the pandemic and 24,680 vaccine doses were administered. The number of second doses rose to  2,518. In the morning, it was announced that an 85-year-old man, an 88-year-old man and a 97-year-old woman died becoming the 262nd, 263rd and 264th victims of the virus.

On 30 January, Malta recorded 136 new cases and 149 recoveries. At time of writing, Malta has 2681 active cases. 3431 swab tests were conducted, a total of 609,737 since the start of the pandemic and 25,822 vaccine doses were administered. The number of second doses rose to 2,969. In the morning, it was announced that an 85-year-old man died becoming the 265th victim of the virus.

On 31 January, Malta recorded 182 new cases and 185 recoveries. At time of writing, Malta has 2676 active cases. 2843 swab tests were conducted, a total of 612,580 since the start of the pandemic and 26,847 vaccine doses were administered. The number of second doses rose to 3,456. In the morning, it was announced that a 78-year-old man and a 63-year-old woman died becoming the 266th and 267th victims of the virus.

February 

On 1 February, Malta recorded 124 new cases and 141 recoveries. At time of writing, Malta has 2657 active cases. 3037 swab tests were conducted, a total of 615,617 since the start of the pandemic and 27,759 vaccine doses were administered. The number of second doses rose to 3,948. In the morning, it was announced that an 81-year-old man and a pianist Cynthia Turner aged 88 died becoming the 268th and 269th victims of the virus.

On 2 February, Malta recorded 141 new cases and 132 recoveries. At time of writing, Malta has 2665 active cases. 2836 swab tests were conducted, a total of 618,453 since the start of the pandemic and 29,002 vaccine doses were administered. The number of second doses rose to 4,476. In the morning, it was announced that a 92-year-old woman died becoming the 270th victim of the virus.

On 3 February, Malta recorded 138 new cases and 190 recoveries. At time of writing, Malta has 2610 active cases. 2973 swab tests were conducted, a total of 621,426 since the start of the pandemic and 30,252 vaccine doses were administered. The number of second doses rose to 4,891. In the morning, it was announced that a 68-year-old man, an 84-year-old man and a 90-year-old woman died becoming the 271st, 272nd and 273rd victims of the virus.

On 4 February, Malta recorded 79 new cases and 144 recoveries. At time of writing, Malta has 2545 active cases. 2944 swab tests were conducted, a total of 624,370 since the start of the pandemic and 31,633 vaccine doses were administered. The number of second doses rose to 5,410.

On 5 February, Malta recorded 57 new cases and 134 recoveries. At time of writing, Malta has 2464 active cases. 3237 swab tests were conducted, a total of 627,607 since the start of the pandemic and 33,477 vaccine doses were administered. The number of second doses rose to 6,457. In the morning, it was announced that an 84-year-old man, an 85-year-old man, a 91-year-old man and a 92-year-old man died becoming the 274th, 275th, 276th and 277th victims of the virus.

On 6 February, Malta recorded 134 new cases and 195 recoveries. At time of writing, Malta has 2401 active cases. 2772 swab tests were conducted, a total of 630,379 since the start of the pandemic and 35,676 vaccine doses were administered. The number of second doses rose to 7,594. In the morning, it was announced that a 69-year-old man and an 85-year-old woman died becoming the 278th and 279th victims of the virus.

On 7 February, Malta recorded 100 new cases and 157 recoveries. At time of writing, Malta has 2341 active cases. 3084 swab tests were conducted, a total of 633,463 since the start of the pandemic and 37,586 vaccine doses were administered. The number of second doses rose to 8,749. In the morning, it was announced that a 93-year-old man, a 77-year-old man and a 77-year-old woman died becoming the 280th, 281st and 282nd victims of the virus.

On 8 February, Malta recorded 137 new cases and 126 recoveries. At time of writing, Malta has 2352 active cases. 3266 swab tests were conducted, a total of 636,729 since the start of the pandemic and 39,257 vaccine doses were administered. The number of second doses rose to 9,918.

On 9 February, Malta recorded 202 new cases and 146 recoveries. At time of writing, Malta has 2406 active cases. 3206 swab tests were conducted, a total of 639,935 since the start of the pandemic and 41,285 vaccine doses were administered. The number of second doses rose to 11,050. In the morning, it was announced that an 85-year-old woman and an 81-year-old man died becoming the 283rd and 284th victims of the virus.

On 10 February, Malta recorded 167 new cases and 165 recoveries. At time of writing, Malta has 2406 active cases. 2217 swab tests were conducted, a total of 642,152 since the start of the pandemic and 43,337 vaccine doses were administered. The number of second doses rose to 12,135. In the morning, it was announced that a 78-year-old man and an 82-year-old woman died becoming the 285th and 286th victims of the virus.

On 11 February, Malta recorded 151 new cases and 156 recoveries. At time of writing, Malta has 2401 active cases. 3491 swab tests were conducted, a total of 645,643 since the start of the pandemic and 44,598 vaccine doses were administered. The number of second doses rose to 12,928.

On 12 February, Malta recorded 164 new cases and 165 recoveries. At time of writing, Malta has 2398 active cases. 2873 swab tests were conducted, a total of 648,516 since the start of the pandemic and 46,344 vaccine doses were administered. The number of second doses rose to  13,820. In the morning, it was announced that an 84-year-old man and an 82-year-old woman died becoming the 287th and 288th victims of the virus.

On 13 February, Malta recorded 154 new cases and 206 recoveries. At time of writing, Malta has 2344 active cases. 2639 swab tests were conducted, a total of 651,155 since the start of the pandemic and 48,474 vaccine doses were administered. The number of second doses rose to 14,739. In the morning, it was announced that an 82-year-old man and a 63-year-old woman died becoming the 289th and 290th victims of the virus.

On 14 February, Malta recorded 138 new cases and 109 recoveries. At time of writing, Malta has 2370 active cases. 2831 swab tests were conducted, a total of 653,986 since the start of the pandemic and 50,175 vaccine doses were administered. The number of second doses rose to 15,601. In the morning, it was announced that a 64-year-old man, a 72-year-old woman and a 60-year-old woman died becoming the 291st, 292nd and 293rd victims of the virus.

On 15 February, Malta recorded 156 new cases and 184 recoveries. At time of writing, Malta has 2340 active cases. 2817 swab tests were conducted, a total of 656,803 since the start of the pandemic and 51,641 vaccine doses were administered. The number of second doses rose to 16,265. In the morning, it was announced that a 97-year-old woman and an 82-year-old man died becoming the 294th and 295th victims of the virus.

On 16 February, Malta recorded 102 new cases and 124 recoveries. At time of writing, Malta has 2316 active cases. 2116 swab tests were conducted, a total of 658,919 since the start of the pandemic and 53,647 vaccine doses were administered. The number of second doses rose to 17,102. In the morning, it was announced that an 83-year-old woman and a 72-year-old man died becoming the 296th and 297th victims of the virus.

On 17 February, Malta recorded 199 new cases and 89 recoveries. At time of writing, Malta has 2425 active cases. 3207 swab tests were conducted, a total of 662,126 since the start of the pandemic and 55,709 vaccine doses were administered. The number of second doses rose to 17,843. In the morning, it was announced that a 74-year-old man died becoming the 298th victim of the virus.

On 18 February, Malta recorded 163 new cases and 156 recoveries. At time of writing, Malta has 2429 active cases. 3209 swab tests were conducted, a total of 665,335 since the start of the pandemic and 57,683 vaccine doses were administered. The number of second doses rose to 18,536. In the morning, it was announced that an 82-year-old man, a 78-year-old man and an 81-year-old man died becoming the 299th, 300th and 301st victims of the virus.

On 19 February, Malta recorded 154 new cases and 148 recoveries. At time of writing, Malta has 2435 active cases. 3282 swab tests were conducted, a total of 668,617 since the start of the pandemic and 59,702 vaccine doses were administered. The number of second doses rose to 19,199.

On 20 February, Malta recorded 199 new cases and 106 recoveries. At time of writing, Malta has 2526 active cases. 3100 swab tests were conducted, a total of 671,717 since the start of the pandemic and 62,059 vaccine doses were administered. The number of second doses rose to 19,828. In the morning, it was announced that a 92-year-old woman and an 84-year-old man died becoming the 302nd and 303rd victims of the virus.

On 21 February, Malta recorded 130 new cases and 134 recoveries. At time of writing, Malta has 2521 active cases. 2660 swab tests were conducted, a total of 674,377 since the start of the pandemic and 63,308 vaccine doses were administered. The number of second doses rose to 20,189. In the morning, it was announced that a 72-year-old man died becoming the 304th victim of the virus.

On 22 February, Malta recorded 193 new cases and 242 recoveries. At time of writing, Malta has 2471 active cases. 2782 swab tests were conducted, a total of 677,159 since the start of the pandemic and 64,419 vaccine doses were administered. The number of second doses rose to 20,531. In the morning, it was announced that a 96-year-old man died becoming the 305th victim of the virus.

On 23 February, Malta recorded 221 new cases and 191 recoveries. At time of writing, Malta has 2500 active cases. 3274 swab tests were conducted, a total of 680,433 since the start of the pandemic and 66,334 vaccine doses were administered. The number of second doses rose to 21,160. In the morning, it was announced that an 84-year-old man died becoming the 306th victim of the virus.

On 24 February, Malta recorded 226 new cases and 220 recoveries. At time of writing, Malta has 2504 active cases. 3274 swab tests were conducted and the total amount of tests that day reflected an additional 1001 rapid tests carried out in the past few weeks, a total of 684,231 since the start of the pandemic and 68,779 vaccine doses were administered. The number of second doses rose to 21,767. In the morning, it was announced that an 84-year-old man and a 97-year-old woman died becoming the 307th and 308th victims of the virus.

On 25 February, Malta recorded 192 new cases and 185 recoveries. At time of writing, Malta has 2508 active cases. 3274 swab tests were conducted, a total of 687,974 since the start of the pandemic and 71,562 vaccine doses were administered. The number of second doses rose to 22,501. In the morning, it was announced that an 84-year-old man, an 83-year-old woman and a 30-year-old woman died becoming the 309th, 310th and 311th victims of the virus.

On 26 February, Malta recorded 258 new cases and 182 recoveries. At time of writing, Malta has 2582 active cases. 3640 swab tests were conducted, a total of 691,614 since the start of the pandemic and 73,644 vaccine doses were administered. The number of second doses rose to 23,395. In the morning, it was announced that an 83-year-old woman and a 76-year-old man died becoming the 312th and 313th victims of the virus.

On 27 February, Malta recorded 237 new cases and 168 recoveries. At time of writing, Malta has 2651 active cases. 3578 swab tests were conducted, a total of 695,192 since the start of the pandemic and 76,159 vaccine doses were administered. The number of second doses rose to 25,118.

On 28 February, Malta recorded 263 new cases and 192 recoveries. At time of writing, Malta has 2720 active cases. 3047 swab tests were conducted, a total of 698,239 since the start of the pandemic and 77,967 vaccine doses were administered. The number of second doses rose to 26,781. In the morning, it was announced that a 76-year-old man and a 57-year-old man died becoming the 314th and 315th victims of the virus.

March 

On 1 March, Malta recorded 175 new cases and 216 recoveries. At time of writing, Malta has 2678 active cases. 3871 swab tests were conducted, a total of 702,110 since the start of the pandemic and 79,624 vaccine doses were administered. The number of second doses rose to 28,048. In the morning, it was announced that an 89-year-old woman died becoming the 316th victim of the virus.

On 2 March, Malta recorded 336 new cases and 80 recoveries. At time of writing, Malta has 2931 active cases. 3572 swab tests were conducted, a total of 705,682 since the start of the pandemic and 81,883 vaccine doses were administered. The number of second doses rose to 29,021. In the morning, it was announced that a 61-year-old woman, a 41-year-old man and a 78-year-old woman died becoming the 317th, 318th and 319th victims of the virus.

On 3 March, Malta recorded 233 new cases and 163 recoveries. At time of writing, Malta has 3000 active cases. 3654 swab tests were conducted, a total of 709,336 since the start of the pandemic and 84,129 vaccine doses were administered. The number of second doses rose to 29,748. In the morning, it was announced that an 84-year-old man and an 86-year-old woman died becoming the 320th and 321st victims of the virus.

On 4 March, Malta recorded 362 new cases and 230 recoveries. At time of writing, Malta has 3128 active cases. 4146 swab tests were conducted, a total of 713,482 since the start of the pandemic and 86,854 vaccine doses were administered. The number of second doses rose to 30,329. In the morning, it was announced that a 68-year-old woman, a 76-year-old woman, a 75-year-old man and a 64-year-old man died becoming the 322nd, 323rd, 324th and 325th victims of the virus.

On 5 March, Malta recorded 283 new cases and 156 recoveries. At time of writing, Malta has 3252 active cases. 3799 swab tests were conducted, a total of 717,281 since the start of the pandemic and 89,946 vaccine doses were administered. The number of second doses rose to 31,034. In the morning, it was announced that a 47-year-old man, a 69-year-old man and a 76-year-old woman died becoming the 326th, 327th and 328th victims of the virus.

On 6 March, Malta recorded 345 new cases and 193 recoveries. At time of writing, Malta has 3403 active cases. 3832 swab tests were conducted, a total of 721,113 since the start of the pandemic and 92,806 vaccine doses were administered. The number of second doses rose to 31,710. In the morning, it was announced that an 88-year-old woman died becoming the 329th victim of the virus.

On 7 March, Malta recorded 182 new cases and 258 recoveries. At time of writing, Malta has 3322 active cases. 3945 swab tests were conducted, a total of 725,058 since the start of the pandemic and 95,899 vaccine doses were administered. The number of second doses rose to 32,420. In the morning, it was announced that a 63-year-old woman, a 95-year-old man, a 78-year-old man, a 50-year-old man and a 51-year-old man died becoming the 330th, 331st, 332nd, 333rd and 334th victims of the virus.

On 8 March, Malta recorded 201 new cases and 345 recoveries. At time of writing, Malta has 3178 active cases. 3946 swab tests were conducted, a total of 729,004 since the start of the pandemic and 97,864 vaccine doses were administered. The number of second doses rose to 32,862.

On 9 March, Malta recorded 248 new cases and 390 recoveries. At time of writing, Malta has 3035 active cases. 4470 swab tests were conducted, a total of 733,474 since the start of the pandemic and 101,776 vaccine doses were administered. The number of second doses rose to 34,181. In the morning, it was announced that an 88-year-old man died becoming the 335th victim of the virus.

On 10 March, Malta recorded 510 new cases and 361 recoveries. At time of writing, Malta has 3182 active cases. 4423 swab tests were conducted, a total of 737,897 since the start of the pandemic and 105,416 vaccine doses were administered. The number of second doses rose to 35,093. In the morning, it was announced that a 73-year-old man and a 64-year-old man died becoming the 336th and 337th victims of the virus.

On 11 March, Malta recorded 283 new cases and 338 recoveries. At time of writing, Malta has 3123 active cases. 4748 swab tests were conducted, a total of 742,643 since the start of the pandemic and 108,971 vaccine doses were administered. The number of second doses rose to 36,246. In the morning, it was announced that a 79-year-old man, a 72-year-old man, a 60-year-old man and an 80-year-old woman died becoming the 338th, 339th, 340th and 341st victims of the virus.

On 12 March, Malta recorded 329 new cases and 259 recoveries. At time of writing, Malta has 3188 active cases. 3779 swab tests were conducted, a total of 746,422 since the start of the pandemic and 113,258 vaccine doses were administered. The number of second doses rose to 37,182. In the morning, it was announced that a 73-year-old man, a 38-year-old man, an 85-year-old woman, a 62-year-old man and a 47-year-old woman died becoming the 342nd, 343rd, 344th, 345th and 346th victims of the virus.

On 13 March, Malta recorded 298 new cases and 338 recoveries. At time of writing, Malta has 3144 active cases. 4333 swab tests were conducted, a total of 750,755 since the start of the pandemic and 117,121 vaccine doses were administered. The number of second doses rose to 38,333. In the morning, it was announced that a 72-year-old man, a 74-year-old man, an 80-year-old woman and an 86-year-old woman died becoming the 347th, 348th, 349th and 350th victims of the virus.

On 14 March, Malta recorded 268 new cases and 287 recoveries. At time of writing, Malta has 3124 active cases. 4305 swab tests were conducted, a total of 755,060 since the start of the pandemic and 120,073 vaccine doses were administered. The number of second doses rose to 39,099. In the morning, it was announced that an 89-year-old man died becoming the 351st victim of the virus.

On 15 March, Malta recorded 213 new cases and 316 recoveries. At time of writing, Malta has 3018 active cases. 3870 swab tests were conducted, a total of 758,930 since the start of the pandemic and 122,366 vaccine doses were administered. The number of second doses rose to 39,695. In the morning, it was announced that an 82-year-old woman, a 69-year-old woman and an 84-year-old man died becoming the 352nd, 353rd and 354th victims of the virus.

On 16 March, Malta recorded 313 new cases and 215 recoveries. At time of writing, Malta has 3113 active cases. 4463 swab tests were conducted, a total of 763,393 since the start of the pandemic and 126,277 vaccine doses were administered. The number of second doses rose to 40,681. In the morning, it was announced that 2 70-year-old women a 73-year-old man died becoming the 355th, 356th and 357th victims of the virus.

On 17 March, Malta recorded 211 new cases and 193 recoveries. At time of writing, Malta has 3127 active cases. 4053 swab tests were conducted, a total of 767,446 since the start of the pandemic and 130,861 vaccine doses were administered. The number of second doses rose to 40,859. In the morning, it was announced that an 83-year-old man, a 68-year-old man, a 62-year-old man and an 84-year-old woman died becoming the 358th, 359th, 360th and 361st victims of the virus.

On 18 March, Malta recorded 243 new cases and 334 recoveries. At time of writing, Malta has 3034 active cases. 4760 swab tests were conducted, a total of 772,260 since the start of the pandemic and 133,871 vaccine doses were administered. The number of second doses rose to 41,621. In the morning, it was announced that a 75-year-old man and a 76-year-old woman died becoming the 362nd and 363rd victims of the virus.

On 19 March, Malta recorded 179 new cases and 314 recoveries. At time of writing, Malta has 2898 active cases. 4046 swab tests were conducted, a total of 776,252 since the start of the pandemic and 138,264 vaccine doses were administered. The number of second doses rose to 42,557. In the morning, it was announced that a 77-year-old woman died becoming the 364th victim of the virus.

On 20 March, Malta recorded 210 new cases and 230 recoveries. At time of writing, Malta has 2873 active cases. 3734 swab tests were conducted, a total of 779,986 since the start of the pandemic and 140,331 vaccine doses were administered. The number of second doses rose to 43,267. In the morning, it was announced that an 85-year-old man, a 68-year-old man, 2 74-year-old women and an 84-year-old woman died becoming the 365th, 366th, 367th, 368th and 369th victims of the virus.

On 21 March, Malta recorded 224 new cases and 358 recoveries. At time of writing, Malta has 2736 active cases. 3749 swab tests were conducted, a total of 783,735 since the start of the pandemic and 143,169 vaccine doses were administered. The number of second doses rose to 43,919. In the morning, it was announced that a 93-year-old woman, a 78-year-old man and a 71-year-old man died becoming the 370th, 371st and 372nd victims of the virus.

On 22 March, Malta recorded 191 new cases and 323 recoveries. At time of writing, Malta has 2603 active cases. 3413 swab tests were conducted, a total of 787,148 since the start of the pandemic and 145,934 vaccine doses were administered. The number of second doses rose to 44,483. In the morning, it was announced that a 99-year-old woman died becoming the 373rd victim of the virus.

On 23 March, Malta recorded 90 new cases and 212 recoveries. At time of writing, Malta has 2479 active cases. 2661 swab tests were conducted, a total of 789,809 since the start of the pandemic and 150,897 vaccine doses were administered. The number of second doses rose to 45,286. In the morning, it was announced that a 76-year-old man and a 63-year-old woman died becoming the 374th and 375th victims of the virus.

On 24 March, Malta recorded 101 new cases and 302 recoveries. At time of writing, Malta has 2276 active cases. 2789 swab tests were conducted, a total of 792,598 since the start of the pandemic and 155,678 vaccine doses were administered. The number of second doses rose to 46,140. In the morning, it was announced that a 79-year-old man and an 84-year-old woman died becoming the 376th and 377th victims of the virus.

On 25 March, Malta recorded 102 new cases and 291 recoveries. At time of writing, Malta has 2086 active cases. 3049 swab tests were conducted, a total of 795,647 since the start of the pandemic and 160,260 vaccine doses were administered. The number of second doses rose to 47,081. In the morning, it was announced that a 76-year-old woman died becoming the 378th victim of the virus.

On 26 March, Malta recorded 103 new cases and 332 recoveries. At time of writing, Malta has 1853 active cases. 2252 swab tests were conducted, a total of 797,899 since the start of the pandemic and 166,104 vaccine doses were administered. The number of second doses rose to 48,933. In the morning, it was announced that a 68-year-old man, a 72-year-old man, a 73-year-old man and an 80-year-old man died becoming the 379th, 380th, 381st and 382nd victims of the virus.

On 27 March, Malta recorded 93 new cases and 283 recoveries. At time of writing, Malta has 1660 active cases. 2928 swab tests were conducted, a total of 800,827 since the start of the pandemic and 171,873 vaccine doses were administered. The number of second doses rose to 50,050. In the morning, it was announced that a 71-year-old woman, a 46-year-old man and a 77-year-old man died becoming the 383rd, 384th and 385th victims of the virus.

On 28 March, Malta recorded 67 new cases and 323 recoveries. At time of writing, Malta has 1402 active cases. 2356 swab tests were conducted, a total of 803,183 since the start of the pandemic and 176,612 vaccine doses were administered. The number of second doses rose to 50,557. In the morning, it was announced that a 74-year-old man and a 71-year-old man died becoming the 386th and 387th victims of the virus.

On 29 March, Malta recorded 63 new cases and 332 recoveries. At time of writing, Malta has 1132 active cases. 2101 swab tests were conducted, a total of 805,284 since the start of the pandemic and 180,587 vaccine doses were administered. The number of second doses rose to 51,237. In the morning, it was announced that a 73-year-old man died becoming the 388th victim of the virus.

On 30 March, Malta recorded 55 new cases and 286 recoveries. At time of writing, Malta has 899 active cases. 2086 swab tests were conducted, a total of 807,370 since the start of the pandemic and 186,111 vaccine doses were administered. The number of second doses rose to 52,340. In the morning, it was announced that veteran journalist and political commentator Godfrey Grima aged 79 and an 83-year-old woman died becoming the 389th and 390th victims of the virus.

On 31 March, Malta recorded 40 new cases and 101 recoveries. At time of writing, Malta has 829 active cases. 1970 swab tests were conducted, a total of 809,340 since the start of the pandemic and 191,716 vaccine doses were administered. The number of second doses rose to 53,540. In the morning, it was announced that an 84-year-old man and a 91-year-old woman died becoming the 391st and 392nd victims of the virus.

April 

On 1 April, Malta recorded 52 new cases and 146 recoveries. At time of writing, Malta has 740 active cases. 1762 swab tests were conducted, a total of 811,102 since the start of the pandemic and 197,383 vaccine doses were administered. The number of second doses rose to 54,578. In the morning, it was announced that a 69-year-old man and a 71-year-old man died becoming the 393rd and 394th victims of the virus.

On 2 April, Malta recorded 42 new cases and 94 recoveries. At time of writing, Malta has 687 active cases. 2361 swab tests were conducted, a total of 813,463 since the start of the pandemic and 203,553 vaccine doses were administered. The number of second doses rose to 55,897. In the morning, it was announced that an 82-year-old man died becoming the 395th victim of the virus.

On 3 April, Malta recorded 62 new cases and 114 recoveries. At time of writing, Malta has 633 active cases. 2289 swab tests were conducted, a total of 815,752 since the start of the pandemic and 209,065 vaccine doses were administered. The number of second doses rose to 57,123. In the morning, it was announced that a 62-year-old man and a 65-year-old man died becoming the 396th and 397th victims of the virus.

On 4 April, Malta recorded 34 new cases and 117 recoveries. At time of writing, Malta has 549 active cases. 2162 swab tests were conducted, a total of 817,914 since the start of the pandemic and 212,466 vaccine doses were administered. The number of second doses rose to 58,004. In the morning, it was announced that a 72-year-old man died becoming the 398th victim of the virus.

On 5 April, Malta recorded 56 new cases and 73 recoveries. At time of writing, Malta has 531 active cases. 1946 swab tests were conducted, a total of 819,860 since the start of the pandemic and 215,700 vaccine doses were administered. The number of second doses rose to 59,032. In the morning, it was announced that a 55-year-old man died becoming the 399th victim of the virus.

On 6 April, Malta recorded 64 new cases and 67 recoveries. At time of writing, Malta has 528 active cases. 2164 swab tests were conducted, a total of 822,024 since the start of the pandemic and 219,161 vaccine doses were administered. The number of second doses rose to 60,096.

On 7 April, Malta recorded 65 new cases and 47 recoveries. At time of writing, Malta has 545 active cases. 2210 swab tests were conducted, a total of 824,234 since the start of the pandemic and 223,020 vaccine doses were administered. The number of second doses rose to 61,111. In the morning, it was announced that a 78-year-old woman died becoming the 400th victim of the virus.

On 8 April, Malta recorded 55 new cases and 45 recoveries. At time of writing, Malta has 554 active cases. 2227 swab tests were conducted, a total of 826,461 since the start of the pandemic and 227,606 vaccine doses were administered. The number of second doses rose to 63,114. In the morning, it was announced that a 76-year-old man died becoming the 401st victim of the virus.

On 9 April, Malta recorded 48 new cases and 53 recoveries. At time of writing, Malta has 549 active cases. 2036 swab tests were conducted, a total of 828,497 since the start of the pandemic and 232,335 vaccine doses were administered. The number of second doses rose to 65,205.

On 10 April, Malta recorded 37 new cases and 49 recoveries. At time of writing, Malta has 536 active cases. 2243 swab tests were conducted, a total of 830,740 since the start of the pandemic and 237,806 vaccine doses were administered. The number of second doses rose to 67,491. In the morning, it was announced that a 96-year-old woman died becoming the 402nd victim of the virus.

On 11 April, Malta recorded 66 new cases and 44 recoveries. At time of writing, Malta has 558 active cases. 1987 swab tests were conducted, a total of 832,727 since the start of the pandemic and 240,984 vaccine doses were administered. The number of second doses rose to 69,306.

On 12 April, Malta recorded 47 new cases and 52 recoveries. At time of writing, Malta has 553 active cases. 2036 swab tests were conducted, a total of 838,497 since the start of the pandemic and 244,718 vaccine doses were administered. The number of second doses rose to 71,481.

On 13 April, Malta recorded 59 new cases and 50 recoveries. At time of writing, Malta has 561 active cases. 1758 swab tests were conducted, a total of 836,521 since the start of the pandemic and 249,400 vaccine doses were administered. The number of second doses rose to 74,053. In the morning, it was announced that a 68-year-old woman died becoming the 403rd victim of the virus.

On 14 April, Malta recorded 58 new cases and 41 recoveries. At time of writing, Malta has 578 active cases. 2001 swab tests were conducted, a total of 838,522 since the start of the pandemic and 254,885 vaccine doses were administered. The number of second doses rose to 76,593.

On 15 April, Malta recorded 55 new cases and 45 recoveries. At time of writing, Malta has 588 active cases. 1803 swab tests were conducted, a total of 840,325 since the start of the pandemic and 259,272 vaccine doses were administered. The number of second doses rose to 78,139.

On 16 April, Malta recorded 27 new cases and 30 recoveries. At time of writing, Malta has 583 active cases. 1883 swab tests were conducted, a total of 842,208 since the start of the pandemic and 264,658 vaccine doses were administered. The number of second doses rose to 80,671. In the morning, it was announced that 2 67-year-old men died becoming the 404th and 405th victims of the virus.

On 17 April, Malta recorded 67 new cases and 38 recoveries. At time of writing, Malta has 608 active cases. 1808 swab tests were conducted, a total of 844,016 since the start of the pandemic and 269,763 vaccine doses were administered. The number of second doses rose to 82,486. In the morning, it was announced that a 77-year-old man, a 79-year-old man, a 63-year-old woman and a 61-year-old woman died becoming the 406th, 407th, 408th and 409th victims of the virus.

On 18 April, Malta recorded 39 new cases and 52 recoveries. At time of writing, Malta has 595 active cases. 1985 swab tests were conducted, a total of 846,001 since the start of the pandemic and 274,641 vaccine doses were administered. The number of second doses rose to 84,152.

On 19 April, Malta recorded 60 new cases and 41 recoveries. At time of writing, Malta has 614 active cases. 1580 swab tests were conducted, a total of 847,581 since the start of the pandemic and 276,516 vaccine doses were administered. The number of second doses rose to 84,933.

On 20 April, Malta recorded 13 new cases and 62 recoveries. At time of writing, Malta has 563 active cases. 1584 swab tests were conducted, a total of 849,165 since the start of the pandemic and 282,841 vaccine doses were administered. The number of second doses rose to 87,770. In the morning, it was announced that a 57-year-old man and an 81-year-old man died becoming the 410th and 411th victims of the virus.

On 21 April, Malta recorded 24 new cases and 65 recoveries. At time of writing, Malta has 522 active cases. 1992 swab tests were conducted, a total of 851,157 since the start of the pandemic and 288,797 vaccine doses were administered. The number of second doses rose to 90,173.

On 22 April, Malta recorded 33 new cases and 36 recoveries. At time of writing, Malta has 519 active cases. 2129 swab tests were conducted, a total of 853,286 since the start of the pandemic and 295,587 vaccine doses were administered. The number of second doses rose to 93,727.

On 23 April, Malta recorded 33 new cases and 38 recoveries. At time of writing, Malta has 513 active cases. 1804 swab tests were conducted, a total of 855,090 since the start of the pandemic and 301,594 vaccine doses were administered. The number of second doses rose to 96,631. In the morning, it was announced that a 93-year-old woman died becoming the 412th victim of the virus.

On 24 April, Malta recorded 20 new cases and 57 recoveries. At time of writing, Malta has 476 active cases. 1628 swab tests were conducted, a total of 856,718 since the start of the pandemic and 307,636 vaccine doses were administered. The number of second doses rose to 98,677.

On 25 April, Malta recorded 25 new cases and 35 recoveries. At time of writing, Malta has 465 active cases. 2112 swab tests were conducted, a total of 858,830 since the start of the pandemic and 311,559 vaccine doses were administered. The number of second doses rose to 99,574. In the morning, it was announced that a 67-year-old man died becoming the 413th victim of the virus.

On 26 April, Malta recorded 15 new cases and 58 recoveries. At time of writing, Malta has 422 active cases. 1449 swab tests were conducted, a total of 860,279 since the start of the pandemic and 313,279 vaccine doses were administered. The number of second doses rose to 100,686.

On 27 April, Malta recorded 45 new cases and 67 recoveries. At time of writing, Malta has 400 active cases. 1512 swab tests were conducted, a total of 861,791 since the start of the pandemic and 318,706 vaccine doses were administered. The number of second doses rose to 102,535.

On 28 April, Malta recorded 15 new cases and 41 recoveries. At time of writing, Malta has 374 active cases. 1690 swab tests were conducted, a total of 863,481 since the start of the pandemic and 323,324 vaccine doses were administered. The number of second doses rose to 103,882.

On 29 April, Malta recorded 27 new cases and 31 recoveries. At time of writing, Malta has 370 active cases. 2040 swab tests were conducted, a total of 865,521 since the start of the pandemic and 326,934 vaccine doses were administered. The number of second doses rose to 104,464.

On 30 April, Malta recorded 16 new cases and 55 recoveries. At time of writing, Malta has 331 active cases. 1761 swab tests were conducted, a total of 867,292 since the start of the pandemic and 331,438 vaccine doses were administered. The number of second doses rose to 105,628.

May 

On 1 May, Malta recorded 15 new cases and 74 recoveries. At time of writing, Malta has 270 active cases. 1781 swab tests were conducted, a total of 869,063 since the start of the pandemic and 335,848 vaccine doses were administered. The number of second doses rose to 107,038. In the morning, it was announced that a 70-year-old man and a 91-year-old man died becoming the 414th and 415th victims of the virus.

On 2 May, Malta recorded 12 new cases and 20 recoveries. At time of writing, Malta has 261 active cases. 2036 swab tests were conducted, a total of 871,099 since the start of the pandemic and 339,727 vaccine doses were administered. The number of second doses rose to 108,216. In the morning, it was announced that an 87-year-old man died becoming the 416th victim of the virus.

On 3 May, Malta recorded 35 new cases and 16 recoveries. At time of writing, Malta has 280 active cases. 1550 swab tests were conducted, a total of 872,649 since the start of the pandemic and 341,909 vaccine doses were administered. The number of second doses rose to 108,716.

On 4 May, Malta recorded 27 new cases and 19 recoveries. At time of writing, Malta has 288 active cases. 1550 swab tests were conducted, a total of 874,285 since the start of the pandemic and 346,951 vaccine doses were administered. The number of second doses rose to 109,933.

On 5 May, Malta recorded 30 new cases and 38 recoveries. At time of writing, Malta has 280 active cases. 1785 swab tests were conducted, a total of 876,070 since the start of the pandemic and 352,421 vaccine doses were administered. The number of second doses rose to 111,318.

On 6 May, Malta recorded 9 new cases and 29 recoveries. At time of writing, Malta has 260 active cases. 1971 swab tests were conducted, a total of 878,041 since the start of the pandemic and 359,429 vaccine doses were administered. The number of second doses rose to 112,731.

On 7 May, Malta recorded 12 new cases and 19 recoveries. At time of writing, Malta has 252 active cases. 1956 swab tests were conducted, a total of 879,997 since the start of the pandemic and 365,902 vaccine doses were administered. the total of first doses were 251,787 and 115,333 people were fully vaccinated. In the morning, it was announced that a 95-year-old woman died becoming the 417th victim of the virus.

On 8 May, Malta recorded 6 new cases and 11 recoveries. At time of writing, Malta has 247 active cases. 2022 swab tests were conducted, a total of 882,019 since the start of the pandemic and 372,620 vaccine doses were administered. the total of first doses were 255,633 and 118,209 people were fully vaccinated.

On 9 May, Malta recorded 9 new cases and 31 recoveries. At time of writing, Malta has 225 active cases. 1766 swab tests were conducted, a total of 883,785 since the start of the pandemic and 375,986 vaccine doses were administered. the total of first doses were 257,781 and 119,427 people were fully vaccinated.

On 10 May, Malta recorded 11 new cases and 23 recoveries. At time of writing, Malta has 213 active cases. 1524 swab tests were conducted, a total of 885,309 since the start of the pandemic and 379,951 vaccine doses were administered. the total of first doses were 258,766 and 121,185 people were fully vaccinated.

On 11 May, Malta recorded 6 new cases and 15 recoveries. At time of writing, Malta has 204 active cases. 1600 swab tests were conducted, a total of 886,909 since the start of the pandemic and 386,760 vaccine doses were administered. the total of first doses were 265,361 and 123,843 people were fully vaccinated.

On 12 May, Malta recorded 5 new cases and 17 recoveries. At time of writing, Malta has 192 active cases. 2170 swab tests were conducted, a total of 889,079 since the start of the pandemic and 392,929 vaccine doses were administered. the total of first doses were 268,118 and 127,255 people were fully vaccinated.

On 13 May, Malta recorded 4 new cases and 7 recoveries. At time of writing, Malta has 189 active cases. 1996 swab tests were conducted, a total of 891,075 since the start of the pandemic and 400,118 vaccine doses were administered. the total of first doses were 272,025 and 130,537 people were fully vaccinated.

On 14 May, Malta recorded 1 new case and 10 recoveries. At time of writing, Malta has 180 active cases. 2017 swab tests were conducted, a total of 893,092 since the start of the pandemic and 406,921 vaccine doses were administered. the total of first doses were 276,041 and 133,332 people were fully vaccinated.

On 15 May, Malta recorded 4 new cases and 7 recoveries. At time of writing, Malta has 177 active cases. 1711 swab tests were conducted, a total of 894,803 since the start of the pandemic and 414,632 vaccine doses were administered. the total of first doses were 280,134 and 136,975 people were fully vaccinated.

On 16 May, Malta recorded 2 new cases and 21 recoveries. At time of writing, Malta has 158 active cases. 2454 swab tests were conducted, a total of 897,257 since the start of the pandemic and 420,815 vaccine doses were administered. the total of first doses were 283,229 and 141,143 people were fully vaccinated.

On 17 May, Malta recorded 4 new cases and 15 recoveries. At time of writing, Malta has 147 active cases. 1541 swab tests were conducted, a total of 898,798 since the start of the pandemic and 424,325 vaccine doses were administered. the total of first doses were 284,395 and 143,487 people were fully vaccinated.

On 18 May, Malta recorded 2 new cases and 21 recoveries. At time of writing, Malta has 128 active cases. 1693 swab tests were conducted, a total of 900,491 since the start of the pandemic and 430,508 vaccine doses were administered. the total of first doses were 286,709 and 147,667 people were fully vaccinated.

On 19 May, Malta recorded 3 new cases and 11 recoveries. At time of writing, Malta has 120 active cases. 1875 swab tests were conducted, a total of 902,366 since the start of the pandemic and 437,654 vaccine doses were administered. the total of first doses were 289,855 and 152,581 people were fully vaccinated.

On 20 May, Malta recorded 2 new cases and 22 recoveries. At time of writing, Malta has 100 active cases. 2234 swab tests were conducted, a total of 904,600 since the start of the pandemic and 445,830 vaccine doses were administered. the total of first doses were 293,178 and 158,489 people were fully vaccinated.

On 21 May, Malta recorded 6 new cases and 10 recoveries. At time of writing, Malta has 96 active cases. 2018 swab tests were conducted, a total of 906,618 since the start of the pandemic and 453,711 vaccine doses were administered. the total of first doses were 296,548 and 164,113 people were fully vaccinated.

On 22 May, Malta recorded 2 new cases and 14 recoveries. At time of writing, Malta has 84 active cases. 1926 swab tests were conducted, a total of 908,544 since the start of the pandemic and 461,215 vaccine doses were administered. the total of first doses were 299,549 and 169,177 people were fully vaccinated.

On 23 May, Malta recorded 5 new cases and 8 recoveries. At time of writing, Malta has 81 active cases. 2409 swab tests were conducted, a total of 910,953 since the start of the pandemic and 468,829 vaccine doses were administered. the total of first doses were 301,274 and 175,246 people were fully vaccinated.

On 24 May, Malta recorded 2 new cases and 11 recoveries. At time of writing, Malta has 72 active cases. 1624 swab tests were conducted, a total of 912,577 since the start of the pandemic and 474,475 vaccine doses were administered. the total of first doses were 302,933 and 180,243 people were fully vaccinated.

On 25 May, Malta recorded 3 new cases and 5 recoveries. At time of writing, Malta has 69 active cases. 1492 swab tests were conducted, a total of 914,069 since the start of the pandemic and 482,577 vaccine doses were administered. the total of first doses were 308,002 and 183,556 people were fully vaccinated. In the morning, it was announced that a 77-year-old woman died becoming the 418th victim of the virus.

On 26 May, Malta recorded 7 new cases and 6 recoveries. At time of writing, Malta has 69 active cases. 2080 swab tests were conducted, a total of 916,149 since the start of the pandemic and 490,524 vaccine doses were administered. the total of first doses were 310,403 and 189,055 people were fully vaccinated. In the morning, it was announced that a 60-year-old man died becoming the 419th victim of the virus.

On 27 May, Malta recorded 4 new cases and 8 recoveries. At time of writing, Malta has 65 active cases. 2316 swab tests were conducted, a total of 918,465 since the start of the pandemic and 498,726 vaccine doses were administered. the total of first doses were 311,903 and 195,856 people were fully vaccinated.

On 28 May, Malta recorded 6 new cases and 5 recoveries. At time of writing, Malta has 66 active cases. 2288 swab tests were conducted, a total of 920,753 since the start of the pandemic and 505,100 vaccine doses were administered. the total of first doses were 314,030 and 200,199 people were fully vaccinated.

On 29 May, Malta recorded 3 new cases and 2 recoveries. At time of writing, Malta has 67 active cases. 2010 swab tests were conducted, a total of 922,763 since the start of the pandemic and 509,312 vaccine doses were administered. the total of first doses were 315,748 and 202,795 people were fully vaccinated.

On 30 May, Malta recorded 4 new cases and 3 recoveries. At time of writing, Malta has 68 active cases. 2279 swab tests were conducted, a total of 925,042 since the start of the pandemic and 512,214 vaccine doses were administered. the total of first doses were 316,224 and 205,221 people were fully vaccinated.

On 31 May, Malta recorded 2 new cases and 4 recoveries. At time of writing, Malta has 66 active cases. 1722 swab tests were conducted, a total of 926,764 since the start of the pandemic and 515,662 vaccine doses were administered. the total of first doses were 316,747 and 208,118 people were fully vaccinated.

June 

On 1 June, Malta recorded 8 new cases and 4 recoveries. At time of writing, Malta has 70 active cases. 2026 swab tests were conducted, a total of 928,790 since the start of the pandemic and 519,994 vaccine doses were administered. the total of first doses were 318,743 and 210,486 people were fully vaccinated.

On 2 June, Malta recorded 10 new cases and 4 recoveries. At time of writing, Malta has 76 active cases. 2275 swab tests were conducted, a total of 931,065 since the start of the pandemic and 528,592 vaccine doses were administered. the total of first doses were 319,574 and 218,321 people were fully vaccinated.

On 3 June, Malta recorded 4 new cases and 4 recoveries. At time of writing, Malta has 76 active cases. 2799 swab tests were conducted, a total of 933,864 since the start of the pandemic and 534,639 vaccine doses were administered. the total of first doses were 322,359 and 221,595 people were fully vaccinated.

On 4 June, Malta recorded 2 new cases and 4 recoveries. At time of writing, Malta has 74 active cases. 2545 swab tests were conducted, a total of 936,409 since the start of the pandemic and 541,178 vaccine doses were administered. the total of first doses were 324,295 and 226,341 people were fully vaccinated.

On 5 June, Malta recorded 9 new cases and 7 recoveries. At time of writing, Malta has 76 active cases. 2764 swab tests were conducted, a total of 939,173 since the start of the pandemic and 546,637 vaccine doses were administered. the total of first doses were 325,511 and 230,594 people were fully vaccinated.

On 6 June, Malta recorded 3 new cases and 5 recoveries. At time of writing, Malta has 74 active cases. 2024 swab tests were conducted, a total of 941,197 since the start of the pandemic and 551,494 vaccine doses were administered. the total of first doses were 327,155 and 233,826 people were fully vaccinated.

On 7 June, Malta recorded no new cases and 2 recoveries. At time of writing, Malta has 72 active cases. 1355 swab tests were conducted, a total of 942,552 since the start of the pandemic and 553,814 vaccine doses were administered. the total of first doses were 328,168 and 235,133 people were fully vaccinated.

On 8 June, Malta recorded 1 new case and 3 recoveries. At time of writing, Malta has 70 active cases. 1432 swab tests were conducted, a total of 943,984 since the start of the pandemic and 558,320 vaccine doses were administered. the total of first doses were 329,000 and 238,807 people were fully vaccinated.

On 9 June, Malta recorded 1 new case and 2 recoveries. At time of writing, Malta has 68 active cases. 1658 swab tests were conducted, a total of 945,642 since the start of the pandemic and 564,718 vaccine doses were administered. the total of first doses were 330,970 and 243,252 people were fully vaccinated.

On 10 June, Malta recorded 4 new cases and 5 recoveries. At time of writing, Malta has 67 active cases. 2123 swab tests were conducted, a total of 947,765 since the start of the pandemic and 570,513 vaccine doses were administered. the total of first doses were 333,197 and 246,964 people were fully vaccinated.

On 11 June, Malta recorded 2 new cases and 5 recoveries. At time of writing, Malta has 64 active cases. 1817 swab tests were conducted, a total of 949,582 since the start of the pandemic and 576,256 vaccine doses were administered. the total of first doses were 334,367 and 251,553 people were fully vaccinated.

On 12 June, Malta recorded 2 new cases and 4 recoveries. At time of writing, Malta has 62 active cases. 1721 swab tests were conducted, a total of 951,303 since the start of the pandemic and 582,206 vaccine doses were administered. the total of first doses were 335,791 and 256,079 people were fully vaccinated.

On 13 June, Malta recorded no new cases and 3 recoveries. At time of writing, Malta has 59 active cases. 1793 swab tests were conducted, a total of 953,096 since the start of the pandemic and 587,160 vaccine doses were administered. the total of first doses were 339,176 and 258,929 people were fully vaccinated.

On 14 June, Malta recorded 1 new case and 6 recoveries. At time of writing, Malta has 54 active cases. 1021 swab tests were conducted, a total of 954,117 since the start of the pandemic and 589,507 vaccine doses were administered. the total of first doses were 340,028 and 260,424 people were fully vaccinated.

On 15 June, Malta recorded no new cases and 3 recoveries. At time of writing, Malta has 51 active cases. 1526 swab tests were conducted, a total of 955,643 since the start of the pandemic and 596,074 vaccine doses were administered. the total of first doses were 341,941 and 265,090 people were fully vaccinated.

On 16 June, Malta recorded 3 new cases and 9 recoveries. At time of writing, Malta has 45 active cases. 1798 swab tests were conducted, a total of 957,441 since the start of the pandemic and 604,033 vaccine doses were administered. the total of first doses were 344,272 and 270,754 people were fully vaccinated.

On 17 June, Malta recorded no new cases and 11 recoveries. At time of writing, Malta has 33 active cases. 1978 swab tests were conducted, a total of 959,419 since the start of the pandemic and 609,867 vaccine doses were administered. the total of first doses were 346,576 and 274,321 people were fully vaccinated. In the morning, it was announced that an 82-year-old man died becoming the 420th victim of the virus.

On 18 June, Malta recorded 3 new cases and 4 recoveries. At time of writing, Malta has 32 active cases. 1965 swab tests were conducted, a total of 961,384 since the start of the pandemic and 616,102 vaccine doses were administered. the total of first doses were 348,633 and 278,588 people were fully vaccinated.

On 19 June, Malta recorded no new cases and 3 recoveries. At time of writing, Malta has 29 active cases. 1660 swab tests were conducted, a total of 963,044 since the start of the pandemic and 621,674 vaccine doses were administered. the total of first doses were 350,092 and 282,709 people were fully vaccinated.

On 20 June, Malta recorded 1 new case and 3 recoveries. At time of writing, Malta has 27 active cases. 1839 swab tests were conducted, a total of 964,883 since the start of the pandemic and 625,844 vaccine doses were administered. the total of first doses were 351,962 and 285,817 people were fully vaccinated.

On 21 June, Malta recorded 1 new case and 5 recoveries. At time of writing, Malta has 23 active cases. 1480 swab tests were conducted, a total of 966,363 since the start of the pandemic and 628,735 vaccine doses were administered. the total of first doses were 352,478 and 288,195 people were fully vaccinated.

On 22 June, Malta recorded 5 new cases and 1 recovery. At time of writing, Malta has 27 active cases. 1649 swab tests were conducted, a total of 968,012 since the start of the pandemic and 631,446 vaccine doses were administered. the total of first doses were 353,164 and 290,280 people were fully vaccinated.

On 23 June, Malta recorded no new cases and 1 recovery. At time of writing, Malta has 26 active cases. 1692 swab tests were conducted, a total of 969,704 since the start of the pandemic and 636,059 vaccine doses were administered. the total of first doses were 353,584 and 294,650 people were fully vaccinated.

On 24 June, Malta recorded 3 new cases and 2 recoveries. At time of writing, Malta has 27 active cases. 2271 swab tests were conducted, a total of 971,975 since the start of the pandemic and 640,729 vaccine doses were administered. the total of first doses were 353,895 and 299,151 people were fully vaccinated.

On 25 June, Malta recorded 5 new cases and 3 recoveries. At time of writing, Malta has 29 active cases. 3127 swab tests were conducted, a total of 975,102 since the start of the pandemic and 646,651 vaccine doses were administered. the total of first doses were 355,100 and 303,939 people were fully vaccinated.

On 26 June, Malta recorded 3 new cases and 2 recoveries. At time of writing, Malta has 30 active cases. 2360 swab tests were conducted, a total of 977,462 since the start of the pandemic and 650,411 vaccine doses were administered. the total of first doses were 355,277 and 307,591 people were fully vaccinated.

On 27 June, Malta recorded no new cases and 2 recoveries. At time of writing, Malta has 28 active cases. 2227 swab tests were conducted, a total of 979,689 since the start of the pandemic and 653,005 vaccine doses were administered. the total of first doses were 356,128 and 309,871 people were fully vaccinated.

On 28 June, Malta recorded 6 new cases. At time of writing, Malta has 34 active cases. 1316 swab tests were conducted, a total of 981,005 since the start of the pandemic and 654,649 vaccine doses were administered. the total of first doses were 356,209 and 311,453 people were fully vaccinated.

On 29 June, Malta recorded 6 new cases. At time of writing, Malta has 40 active cases. 2250 swab tests were conducted, a total of 983,255 since the start of the pandemic and 659,488 vaccine doses were administered. the total of first doses were 357,171 and 315,768 people were fully vaccinated.

On 30 June, Malta recorded 5 new cases. At time of writing, Malta has 45 active cases. 2374 swab tests were conducted, a total of 985,629 since the start of the pandemic and 664,859 vaccine doses were administered. the total of first doses were 358,168 and 320,604 people were fully vaccinated.

July 

On 1 July, Malta recorded 4 new cases and 3 recoveries. At time of writing, Malta has 46 active cases. 2528 swab tests were conducted, a total of 988,157 since the start of the pandemic and 670,759 vaccine doses were administered. the total of first doses were 359,169 and 325,891 people were fully vaccinated.

On 2 July, Malta recorded 6 new cases. At time of writing, Malta has 52 active cases. 2717 swab tests were conducted, a total of 990,874 since the start of the pandemic and 675,014 vaccine doses were administered. the total of first doses were 360,364 and 328,960 people were fully vaccinated.

On 3 July, Malta recorded 7 new cases and 3 recoveries. At time of writing, Malta has 56 active cases. 2841 swab tests were conducted, a total of 993,715 since the start of the pandemic and 679,538 vaccine doses were administered. the total of first doses were 361,287 and 332,650 people were fully vaccinated.

On 4 July, Malta recorded 12 new cases. At time of writing, Malta has 68 active cases. 2916 swab tests were conducted, a total of 996,631 since the start of the pandemic and 682,731 vaccine doses were administered. the total of first doses were 362,262 and 335,153 people were fully vaccinated.

On 5 July, Malta recorded 12 new cases and 1 recovery. At time of writing, Malta has 79 active cases. 2235 swab tests were conducted, a total of 998,866 since the start of the pandemic and 685,024 vaccine doses were administered. the total of first doses were 362,986 and 336,800 people were fully vaccinated.

On 6 July, Malta recorded 11 new cases. At time of writing, Malta has 90 active cases. 2481 swab tests were conducted, a total of 1,001,347 since the start of the pandemic and 689,924 vaccine doses were administered. the total of first doses were 364,277 and 340,423 people were fully vaccinated.

On 7 July, Malta recorded 25 new cases and 5 recoveries. At time of writing, Malta has 110 active cases. 2481 swab tests were conducted, a total of 1,003,842 since the start of the pandemic and 692,581 vaccine doses were administered. the total of first doses were 365,611 and 341,765 people were fully vaccinated.

On 8 July, Malta recorded 55 new cases and 6 recoveries. At time of writing, Malta has 159 active cases. 2668 swab tests were conducted, a total of 1,006,510 since the start of the pandemic and 696,858 vaccine doses were administered. the total of first doses were 367,086 and 344,666 people were fully vaccinated.

On 9 July, Malta recorded 96 new cases and 3 recoveries. At time of writing, Malta has 252 active cases. 2903 swab tests were conducted, a total of 1,009,413 since the start of the pandemic and 700,180 vaccine doses were administered. the total of first doses were 368,449 and 346,739 people were fully vaccinated.

On 10 July, Malta recorded 109 new cases and 2 recoveries. At time of writing, Malta has 359 active cases. 3164 swab tests were conducted, a total of 1,012,577 since the start of the pandemic and 703,928 vaccine doses were administered. the total of first doses were 369,854 and 349,133 people were fully vaccinated.

On 11 July, Malta recorded 101 new cases and 3 recoveries. At time of writing, Malta has 457 active cases. 3224 swab tests were conducted, a total of 1,015,801 since the start of the pandemic and 705,852 vaccine doses were administered. the total of first doses were 371,421 and 349,961 people were fully vaccinated.

On 12 July, Malta recorded 179 new cases and 2 recoveries. At time of writing, Malta has 634 active cases. 2647 swab tests were conducted, a total of 1,018,448 since the start of the pandemic and 706,857 vaccine doses were administered. the total of first doses were 372,052 and 350,338 people were fully vaccinated.

On 13 July, Malta recorded 154 new cases and 6 recoveries. At time of writing, Malta has 782 active cases. 3353 swab tests were conducted, a total of 1,021,801 since the start of the pandemic and 709,131 vaccine doses were administered. the total of first doses were 373,349 and 351,395 people were fully vaccinated. In the afternoon, it was announced that a 5-year-old girl died becoming the youngest victim of the virus. The young girl died on Saturday afternoon after developing a fever the day before. She was admitted to Mater Dei Hospital in a critical state and died sometime later after receiving CPR. While she tested negative for COVID-19 upon her admission to hospital, a second COVID-19 test was “mildly reactive” to the virus. It has yet to be established whether the second swab test's outcome is significant and a magisterial inquiry is also under way, as is the norm when a patient dies within 24 hours of being admitted to hospital. The child had no known underlying health conditions and none of her family members has tested positive for the virus. She was not attending summer schools

On 14 July, Malta recorded 218 new cases. At time of writing, Malta has 1000 active cases. 4188 swab tests were conducted, a total of 1,025,989 since the start of the pandemic and 711,973 vaccine doses were administered. the total of first doses were 375,090 and 352,523 people were fully vaccinated.

On 15 July, Malta recorded 222 new cases and 10 recoveries. At time of writing, Malta has 1212 active cases. 3629 swab tests were conducted, a total of 1,029,618 since the start of the pandemic and 715,447 vaccine doses were administered. the total of first doses were 377,373 and 353,929 people were fully vaccinated.

On 16 July, Malta recorded 235 new cases and 6 recoveries. At time of writing, Malta has 1441 active cases. 3879 swab tests were conducted, a total of 1,033,497 since the start of the pandemic and 718,418 vaccine doses were administered. the total of first doses were 379,380 and 354,985 people were fully vaccinated.

On 17 July, Malta recorded 206 new cases and 5 recoveries. At time of writing, Malta has 1642 active cases. 4373 swab tests were conducted, a total of 1,037,870 since the start of the pandemic and 721,415 vaccine doses were administered. the total of first doses were 381,764 and 355,883 people were fully vaccinated.

On 18 July, Malta recorded 195 new cases and 5 recoveries. At time of writing, Malta has 1832 active cases. 3548 swab tests were conducted, a total of 1,041,418 since the start of the pandemic and 723,299 vaccine doses were administered. the total of first doses were 383,158 and 357,236 people were fully vaccinated.

On 19 July, Malta recorded 146 new cases and 15 recoveries. At time of writing, Malta has 1963 active cases. 3809 swab tests were conducted, a total of 1,045,227 since the start of the pandemic and 724,343 vaccine doses were administered. the total of first doses were 383,867 and 357,558 people were fully vaccinated.

On 20 July, Malta recorded 217 new cases and 3 recoveries. At time of writing, Malta has 2177 active cases. 4091 swab tests were conducted, a total of 1,049,318 since the start of the pandemic and 728,106 vaccine doses were administered. the total of first doses were 386,328 and 359,042 people were fully vaccinated.

On 21 July, Malta recorded 199 new cases and 30 recoveries. At time of writing, Malta has 2346 active cases. 3976 swab tests were conducted, a total of 1,053,294 since the start of the pandemic and 730,483 vaccine doses were administered. the total of first doses were 387,329 and 360,880 people were fully vaccinated.

On 22 July, Malta recorded 166 new cases and 25 recoveries. At time of writing, Malta has 2487 active cases. 4302 swab tests were conducted, a total of 1,057,596 since the start of the pandemic and 733,736 vaccine doses were administered. the total of first doses were 389,025 and 362,923 people were fully vaccinated.

On 23 July, Malta recorded 172 new cases and 65 recoveries. At time of writing, Malta has 2497 active cases and 97 of the cases have been repatriated. 3640 swab tests were conducted, a total of 1,061,236 since the start of the pandemic and 736,727 vaccine doses were administered. the total of first doses were 389,263 and 364,899 people were fully vaccinated.

On 24 July, Malta recorded 171 new cases and 95 recoveries. At time of writing, Malta has 2373 active cases and 299 of the cases have been repatriated. 3926 swab tests were conducted, a total of 1,065,162 since the start of the pandemic and 742,361 vaccine doses were administered. the total of first doses were 392,444 and 368,587 people were fully vaccinated. In the morning, it was announced that a 73-year-old woman died becoming the 421st victim of the virus.

On 25 July, Malta recorded 127 new cases and 109 recoveries. At time of writing, Malta has 2294 active cases. 3504 swab tests were conducted, a total of 1,068,666 since the start of the pandemic and 743,712 vaccine doses were administered. the total of first doses were 392,994 and 369,441 people were fully vaccinated.

On 26 July, Malta recorded 94 new cases and 126 recoveries. At time of writing, Malta has 2262 active cases. 3136 swab tests were conducted, a total of 1,071,802 since the start of the pandemic and 744,521 vaccine doses were administered. the total of first doses were 393,062 and 370,187 people were fully vaccinated.

On 27 July, Malta recorded 142 new cases and 174 recoveries. At time of writing, Malta has 2230 active cases. 3136 swab tests were conducted, a total of 1,075,833 since the start of the pandemic and 746,883 vaccine doses were administered. the total of first doses were 393,967 and 371,802 people were fully vaccinated.

On 28 July, Malta recorded 91 new cases and 125 recoveries. At time of writing, Malta has 2194 active cases. 3862 swab tests were conducted, a total of 1,079,695 since the start of the pandemic and 750,641 vaccine doses were administered. the total of first doses were 396,087 and 373,771 people were fully vaccinated. In the morning, it was announced that a 95-year-old man and an 86-year-old man died becoming the 422nd and 423rd victims of the virus.

On 29 July, Malta recorded 95 new cases and 229 recoveries. At time of writing, Malta has 2060 active cases. 3795 swab tests were conducted, a total of 1,083,490 since the start of the pandemic and 751,546 vaccine doses were administered. the total of first doses were 396,686 and 375,373 people were fully vaccinated.

On 30 July, Malta recorded 111 new cases and 199 recoveries. At time of writing, Malta has 1972 active cases. 3693 swab tests were conducted, a total of 1,087,183 since the start of the pandemic and 755,655 vaccine doses were administered. the total of first doses were 398,444 and 379,016 people were fully vaccinated.

On 31 July, Malta recorded 94 new cases and 219 recoveries. At time of writing, Malta has 1847 active cases. 3483 swab tests were conducted, a total of 1,090,666 since the start of the pandemic and 758,252 vaccine doses were administered. the total of first doses were 399,261 and 380,927 people were fully vaccinated.

August 

On 1 August, Malta recorded 80 new cases and 214 recoveries. At time of writing, Malta has 1713 active cases. 3378 swab tests were conducted, a total of 1,094,044 since the start of the pandemic and 759,818 vaccine doses were administered. the total of first doses were 399,690 and 382,255 people were fully vaccinated.

On 2 August, Malta recorded 64 new cases and 168 recoveries. At time of writing, Malta has 1609 active cases. 2762 swab tests were conducted, a total of 1,096,806 since the start of the pandemic and 760,417 vaccine doses were administered. the total of first doses were 399,724 and 382,825 people were fully vaccinated.

On 3 August, Malta recorded 69 new cases and 134 recoveries. At time of writing, Malta has 1544 active cases. 3157 swab tests were conducted, a total of 1,099,963 since the start of the pandemic and 762,832 vaccine doses were administered. the total of first doses were 400,760 and 385,049 people were fully vaccinated.

On 4 August, Malta recorded 82 new cases and 293 recoveries. At time of writing, Malta has 1333 active cases. 3346 swab tests were conducted, a total of 1,103,309 since the start of the pandemic and 765,417 vaccine doses were administered. the total of first doses were 401,644 and 387,400 people were fully vaccinated.

On 5 August, Malta recorded 78 new cases and 204 recoveries. At time of writing, Malta has 1206 active cases. 3260 swab tests were conducted, a total of 1,106,569 since the start of the pandemic and 767,831 vaccine doses were administered. the total of first doses were 402,373 and 389,610 people were fully vaccinated. In the morning, it was announced that an 88-year-old woman died becoming the 424th victim of the virus.

On 6 August, Malta recorded 48 new cases and 120 recoveries. At time of writing, Malta has 1134 active cases. 3508 swab tests were conducted, a total of 1,110,077 since the start of the pandemic and 770,496 vaccine doses were administered. the total of first doses were 403,261 and 392,100 people were fully vaccinated.

On 7 August, Malta recorded 71 new cases and 147 recoveries. At time of writing, Malta has 1058 active cases. 3593 swab tests were conducted, a total of 1,113,670 since the start of the pandemic and 773,225 vaccine doses were administered. the total of first doses were 404,049 and 394,589 people were fully vaccinated.

On 8 August, Malta recorded 59 new cases and 170 recoveries. At time of writing, Malta has 945 active cases. 3526 swab tests were conducted, a total of 1,117,196 since the start of the pandemic and 774,250 vaccine doses were administered. the total of first doses were 404,419 and 395,537 people were fully vaccinated. In the morning, it was announced that a 77-year-old man and a 63-year-old woman died becoming the 425th and 426th victims of the virus.

On 9 August, Malta recorded 56 new cases and 121 recoveries. At time of writing, Malta has 878 active cases. 2615 swab tests were conducted, a total of 1,119,811 since the start of the pandemic and 774,907 vaccine doses were administered. the total of first doses were 404,461 and 396,160 people were fully vaccinated. In the morning, it was announced that a 63-year-old man and a 71-year-old woman died becoming the 427th and 428th victims of the virus.

On 10 August, Malta recorded 51 new cases and 70 recoveries. At time of writing, Malta has 859 active cases. 3093 swab tests were conducted, a total of 1,122,904 since the start of the pandemic and 777,181 vaccine doses were administered. the total of first doses were 405,073 and 398,128 people were fully vaccinated.

On 11 August, Malta recorded 87 new cases and 137 recoveries. At time of writing, Malta has 808 active cases. 3466 swab tests were conducted, a total of 1,126,370 since the start of the pandemic and 778,936 vaccine doses were administered. the total of first doses were 405,723 and 399,769 people were fully vaccinated. In the morning, it was announced that a 79-year-old woman died becoming the 429th victim of the virus.

On 12 August, Malta recorded 51 new cases and 118 recoveries. At time of writing, Malta has 741 active cases. 3417 swab tests were conducted, a total of 1,129,787 since the start of the pandemic and 780,770 vaccine doses were administered. the total of first doses were 406,414 and 401,390 people were fully vaccinated.

On 13 August, Malta recorded 101 new cases and 119 recoveries. At time of writing, Malta has 723 active cases. 3597 swab tests were conducted, a total of 1,133,384 since the start of the pandemic and 782,600 vaccine doses were administered. the total of first doses were 407,171 and 403,015 people were fully vaccinated.

On 14 August, Malta recorded 94 new cases and 120 recoveries. At time of writing, Malta has 696 active cases. 3598 swab tests were conducted, a total of 1,136,982 since the start of the pandemic and 783,983 vaccine doses were administered. the total of first doses were 407,679 and 404,213 people were fully vaccinated. In the morning, it was announced that an 85-year-old woman died becoming the 430th victim of the virus.

On 15 August, Malta recorded 51 new cases and 100 recoveries. At time of writing, Malta has 647 active cases. 3290 swab tests were conducted, a total of 1,140,272 since the start of the pandemic and 784,626 vaccine doses were administered. the total of first doses were 407,948 and 404,679 people were fully vaccinated.

On 16 August, Malta recorded 43 new cases and 80 recoveries. At time of writing, Malta has 609 active cases. 2822 swab tests were conducted, a total of 1,143,094 since the start of the pandemic and 783,729 vaccine doses were administered. the total of first doses were 407,985 and 404,760 people were fully vaccinated. In the morning, it was announced that an 86-year-old woman died becoming the 431st victim of the virus.

On 17 August, Malta recorded 54 new cases and 57 recoveries. At time of writing, Malta has 604 active cases. 3112 swab tests were conducted, a total of 1,146,206 since the start of the pandemic and 786,015 vaccine doses were administered. the total of first doses were 408,546 and 405,578 people were fully vaccinated. In the morning, it was announced that a 62-year-old woman and a 91-year-old man died becoming the 432nd and 433rd victims of the virus.

On 18 August, Malta recorded 82 new cases and 71 recoveries. At time of writing, Malta has 615 active cases. 3192 swab tests were conducted, a total of 1,149,398 since the start of the pandemic and 787,194 vaccine doses were administered. the total of first doses were 409,095 and 406,325 people were fully vaccinated.

On 19 August, Malta recorded 86 new cases and 56 recoveries. At time of writing, Malta has 643 active cases. 3496 swab tests were conducted, a total of 1,152,894 since the start of the pandemic and 788,292 vaccine doses were administered. the total of first doses were 409,498 and 407,154 people were fully vaccinated. In the morning, it was announced that a 96-year-old woman and a 79-year-old man died becoming the 434th and 435th victims of the virus.

On 20 August, Malta recorded 51 new cases and 53 recoveries. At time of writing, Malta has 641 active cases. 3496 swab tests were conducted, a total of 1,156,019 since the start of the pandemic and 789,540 vaccine doses were administered. the total of first doses were 410,087 and 408,010 people were fully vaccinated.

On 21 August, Malta recorded 68 new cases and 44 recoveries. At time of writing, Malta has 664 active cases. 3247 swab tests were conducted, a total of 1,159,266 since the start of the pandemic and 790,833 vaccine doses were administered. the total of first doses were 410,650 and 408,885 people were fully vaccinated. In the morning, it was announced that an 88-year-old man died becoming the 436th victim of the virus.

On 22 August, Malta recorded 53 new cases and 50 recoveries. At time of writing, Malta has 667 active cases. 3025 swab tests were conducted, a total of 1,162,291 since the start of the pandemic and 791,240 vaccine doses were administered. the total of first doses were 410,856 and 409,136 people were fully vaccinated.

On 23 August, Malta recorded 57 new cases and 37 recoveries. At time of writing, Malta has 687 active cases. 2656 swab tests were conducted, a total of 1,164,947 since the start of the pandemic and 791,292 vaccine doses were administered. the total of first doses were 410,884 and 409,183 people were fully vaccinated.

On 24 August, Malta recorded 35 new cases and 40 recoveries. At time of writing, Malta has 681 active cases. 3440 swab tests were conducted, a total of 1,168,387 since the start of the pandemic and 792,173 vaccine doses were administered. the total of first doses were 411,306 and 409,969 people were fully vaccinated. In the morning, it was announced that a 65-year-old man died becoming the 437th victim of the virus.

References

COVID-19 pandemic in Malta
Malta